= Canna 'R. Wallace' =

Flowering plant cultivar

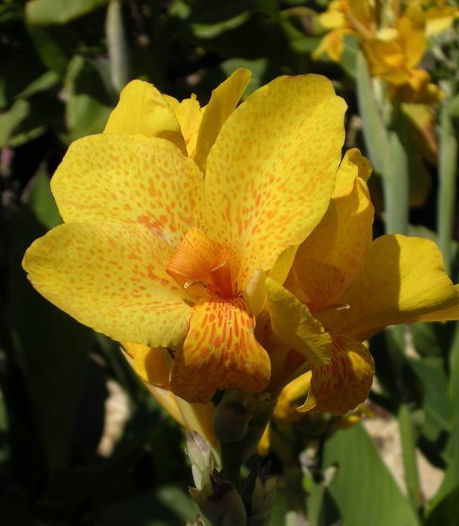
- Genus: Canna
- Cultivar group: 'Crozy Group'
- Cultivar: 'R. Wallace'
- Breeder: A. Crozy, Lyon, France in 1889
- Origin: Wilhelm Pfitzer, Germany, 1907

Canna 'R. Wallace' is a medium sized, Crozy Group canna cultivar; green foliage, oblong shaped, white margin, spreading habit; round stems, coloured green; flowers are open, pale yellow with red spots, staminodes are large, edges regular, stamen is rose-red with small yellow flecks; fertile both ways, not self-pollinating or true to type, capsules round; rhizomes are thick, up to 3 cm in diameter, coloured white and pink.

Introduced by the venerable firm of Wilhelm Pfitzer, Fellbach, Germany in 1907, and named for Sir Richard Wallace, 1st Baronet. In the same year it was awarded the RHS Award of Merit (AM), entered as a Crozy Group cultivar and the RHS described it and classified it as such. There can be no doubt that this Pfitzer bred cultivar is a Crozy Group cultivar.

From the mid-1970s onwards, many nurserymen have confused this fine heritage cultivar with the Italian Group cultivar Canna 'Austria'. Prior to this the US nursery catalogues show that the correct plant was being sold under this name. The only similarity with C. 'Austria' is the basic colours of the foliage and flowers. The shapes and style are very different. Research indicates that in the Spring Hill Nurseries, USA catalogue of 1972 there is an illustration which shows a floppy Italian Group, not a Crozy Group, type and they may be the original source of confusion.

== Synonyms ==
- Canna 'Canary Bird' - confined to the USA.
- Canna 'R. Wallis' - Tropical Planting and Gardening, H.F. MacMillan, 5th Edition, 1954
- Canna 'Richard Wallace' - The earliest reference to this synonym was the Burgess Seed and Plant Co, USA, Catalogue of 1939.

== See also ==
- Canna
- Canna gallery
