= List of Canna cultivars =

This list of Canna cultivars is a gallery of named cultivars of plants in the genus Canna that are representative of the various Canna cultivar groups (i.e., groups of very similar cultivars).

Names of cultivars conform to the rules of the International Society for Horticultural Science (ISHS) Commission for Nomenclature and Cultivar Registration, as laid down in the International Code of Nomenclature for Cultivated Plants. They are registered with an International Cultivar Registration Authority (ICRA), which for the genus Canna is the Royal General Bulbgrowers' Association of the Netherlands (KAVB).

== Foliage group ==
Cultivars, F1 and F2 hybrids, normally with small species-like flowers, but grown principally for their foliage. This group has occasionally been referred to as the Année Group, after the originator, Théodore Année, the world's first Canna hybridizer. However, the use of an accented character in the name creates problems, both in pronunciation and keyboard entry, that it was felt that as they were grown primarily for foliage, then "Foliage Group" was the better name choice.

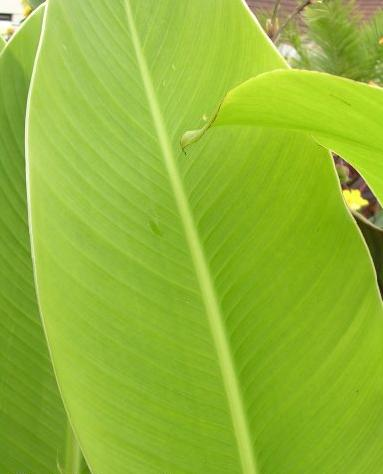
Canna 'Argentina', I. Cooke 1999

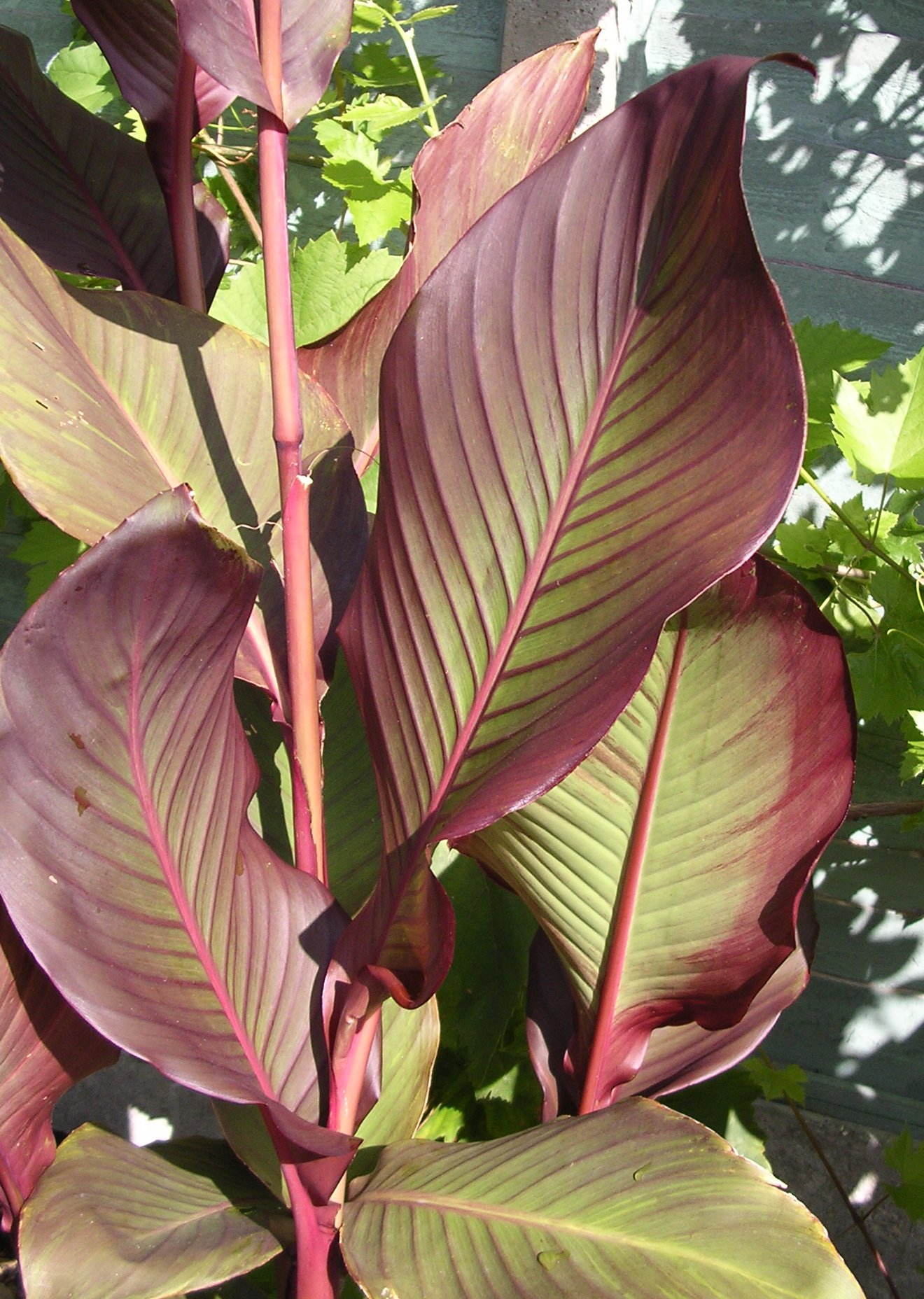
Canna 'Auguste Ferrier'

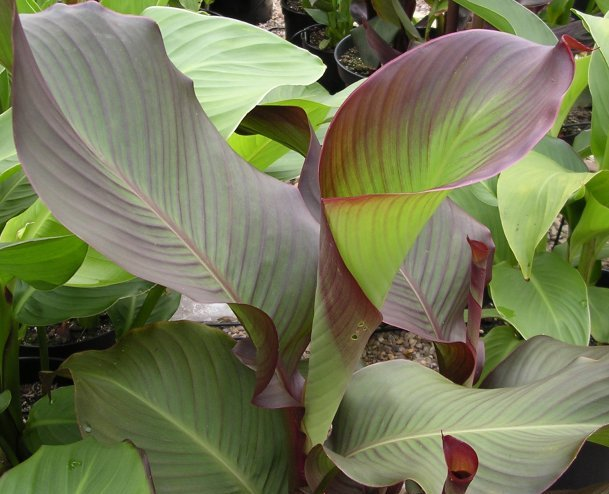
Canna (Agriculture Group) 'Edulis Dark'

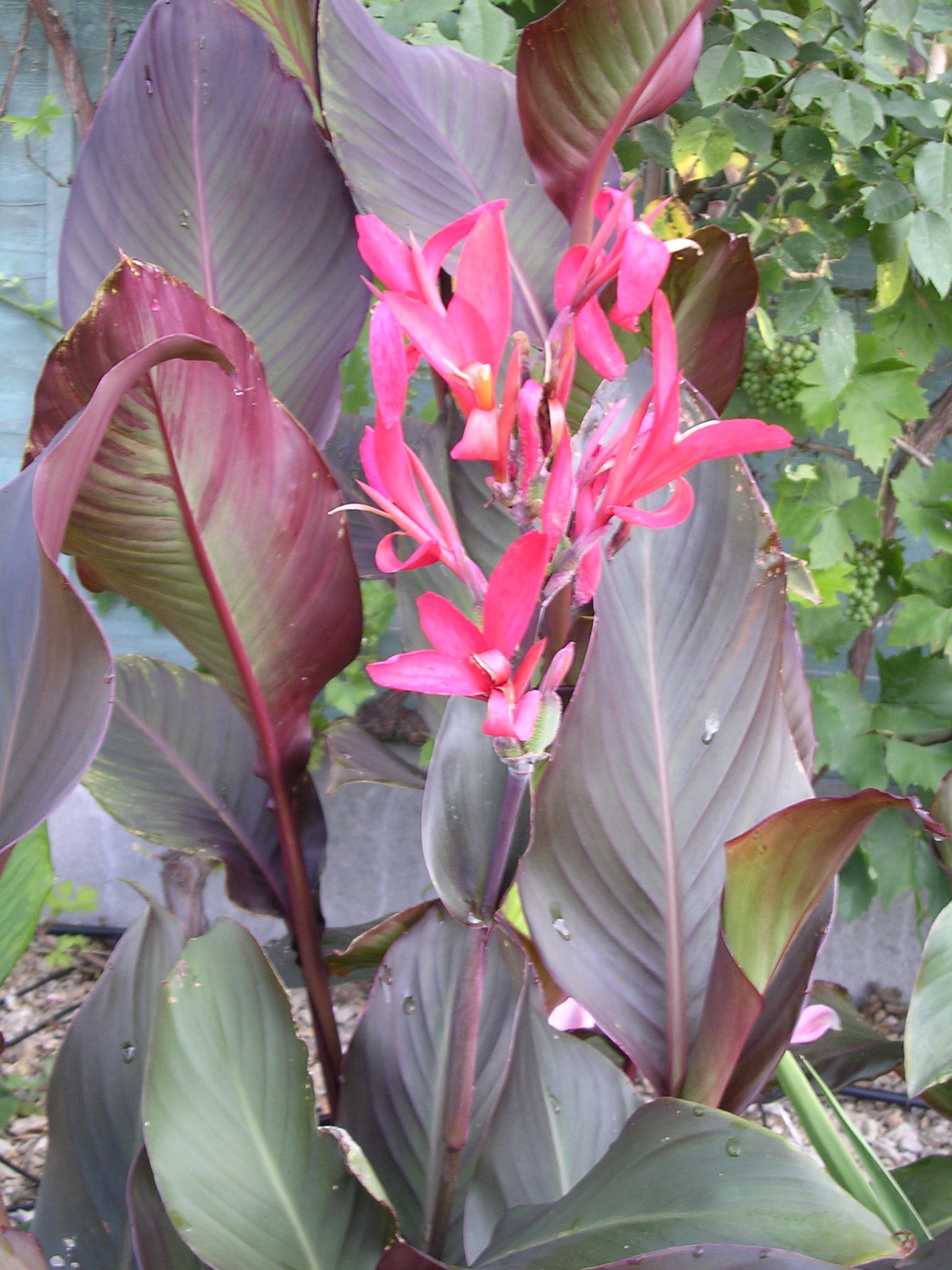
Canna 'Ferrandii'

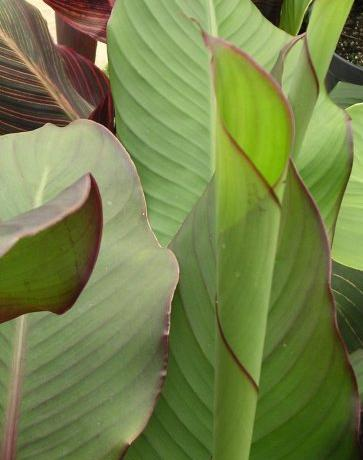
Canna 'Musaefolia Grande', H. Kelly Jnr.

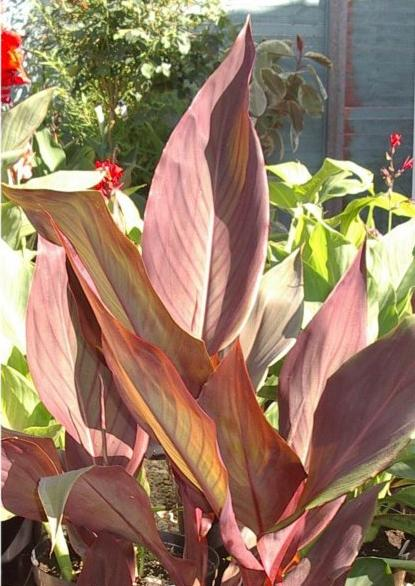
Canna 'Intrigue'

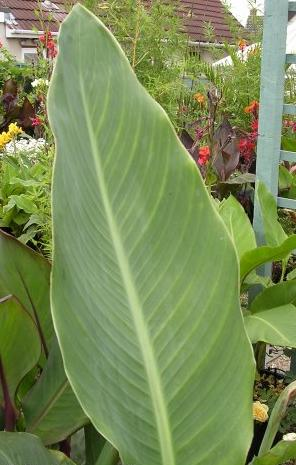
Canna 'Omega'

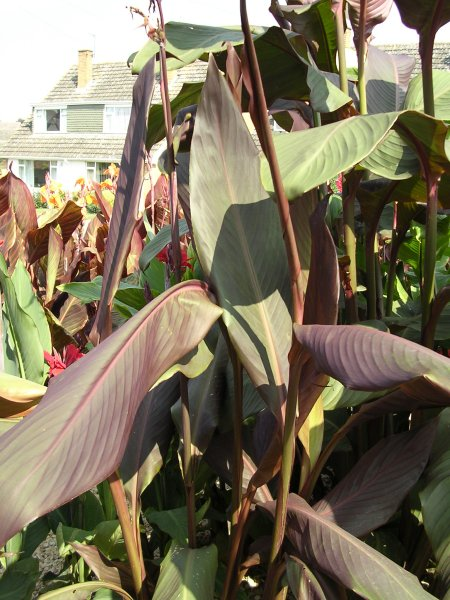
Canna 'Russian Lance', Dalebö 2001

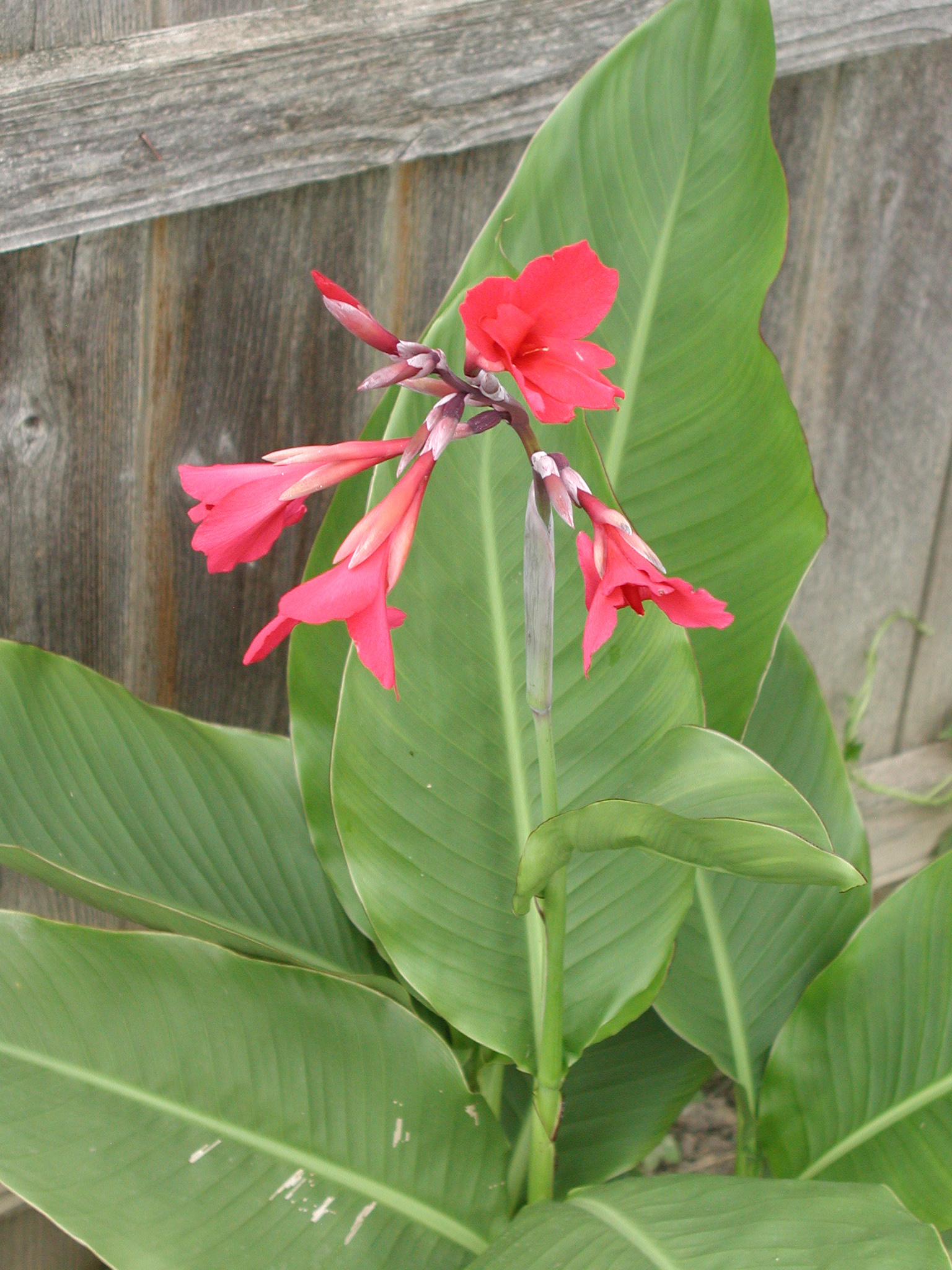
Canna × ehemannii

== Crozy group ==
A cultivar group where the flower spikes are arranged close together on the stalk and have narrow to medium petals. There is always space between the staminodes when arranged formally, and the labellum (lip) is smaller than the staminodes, and is often twisted or curled.

The pioneer of this group was Monsieur Crozy of Lyon, France, who started breeding cannas as early as 1862, from stock originally developed by Théodore Année.

They are sometimes referred to as gladiolus flowering cannas, but describing flowers as similar to another genus is not encouraged. In the past, they were called the Canna × generalis L.H. Bailey garden species, but the use of nothospecies for complex garden hybrids have been replaced by Cultivar Groups in the International Code of Nomenclature for Cultivated Plants.

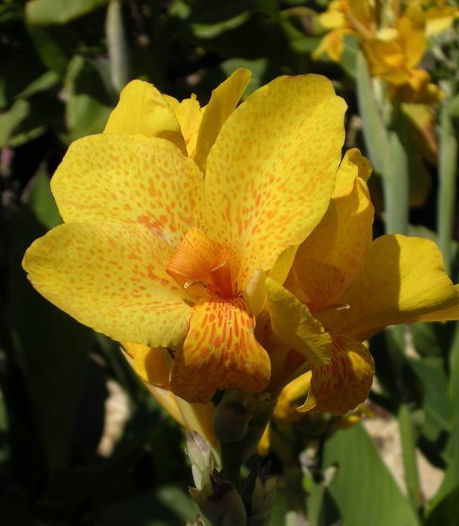
Canna 'R. Wallace', Pfitzer 1902

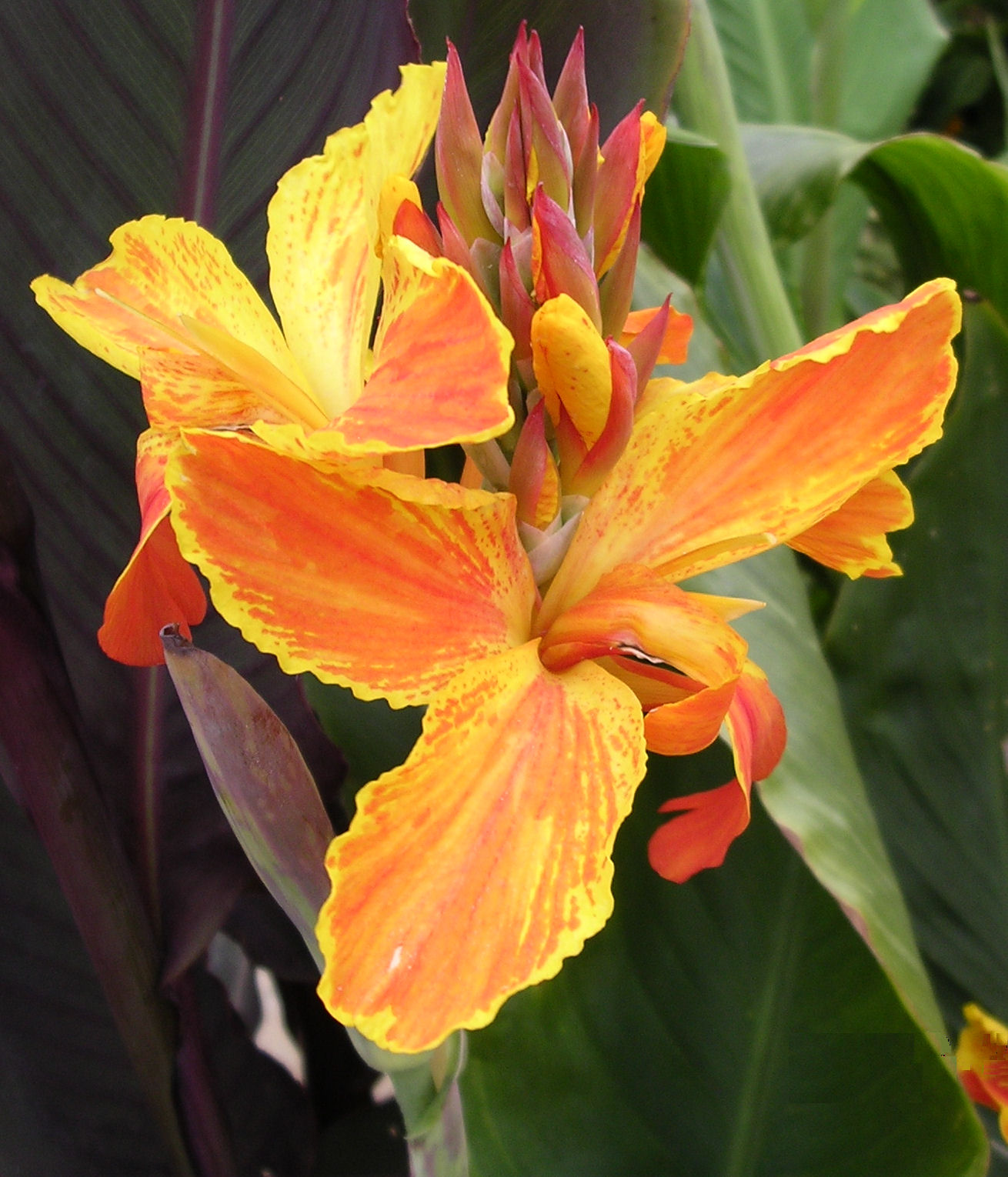
Canna 'Anette Dalebö', Dalebö 2006

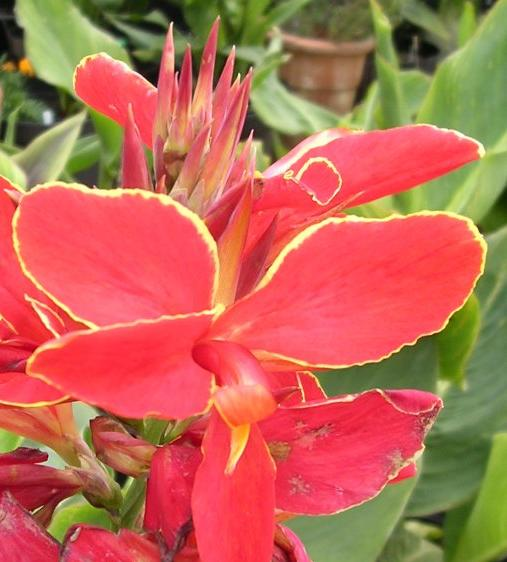
Canna 'Antonin Crozy', Crozy

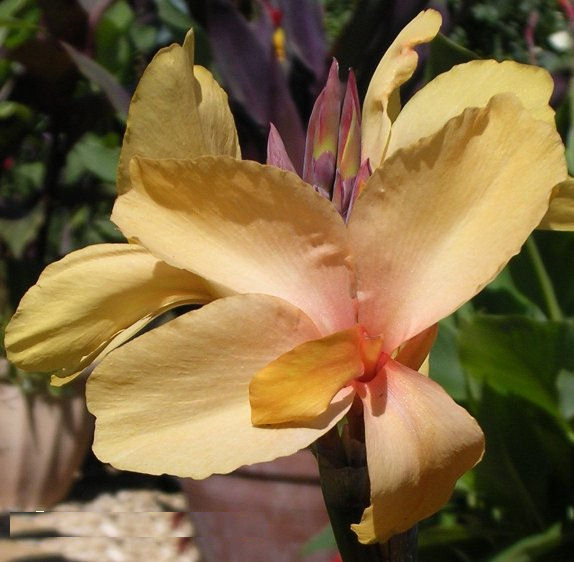
Canna 'Apricot Dream', K. Kelly

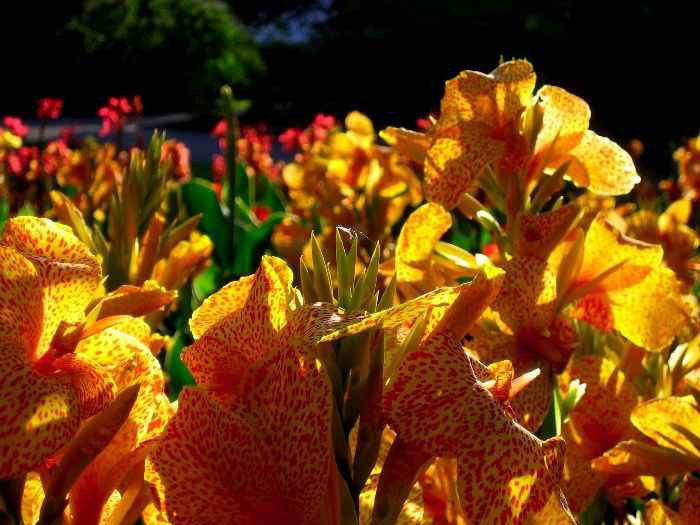
Canna 'Florence Vaughan', Crozy 1892

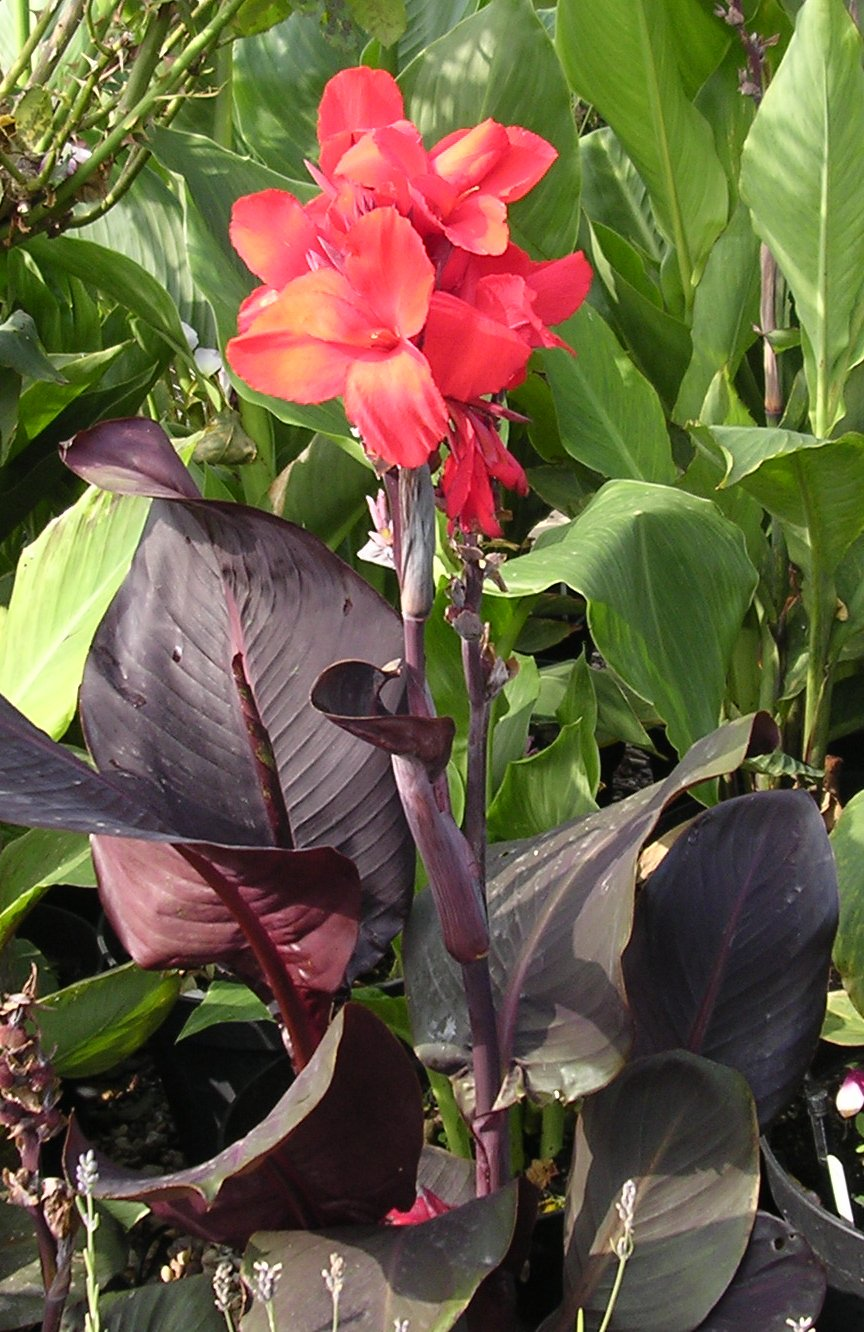
Canna 'Jessie Dalebö', Dalebö 2003

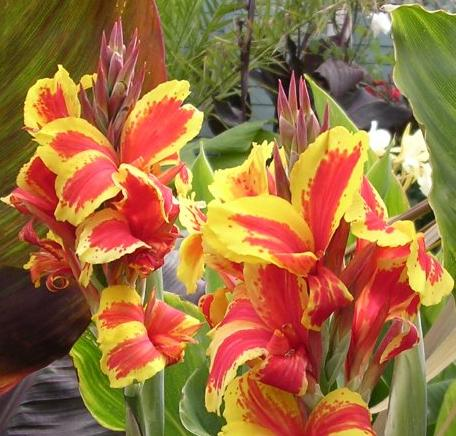
Canna 'Königin Charlotte', Pfitzer 1893

Canna 'Madame Crozy', Crozy 1890

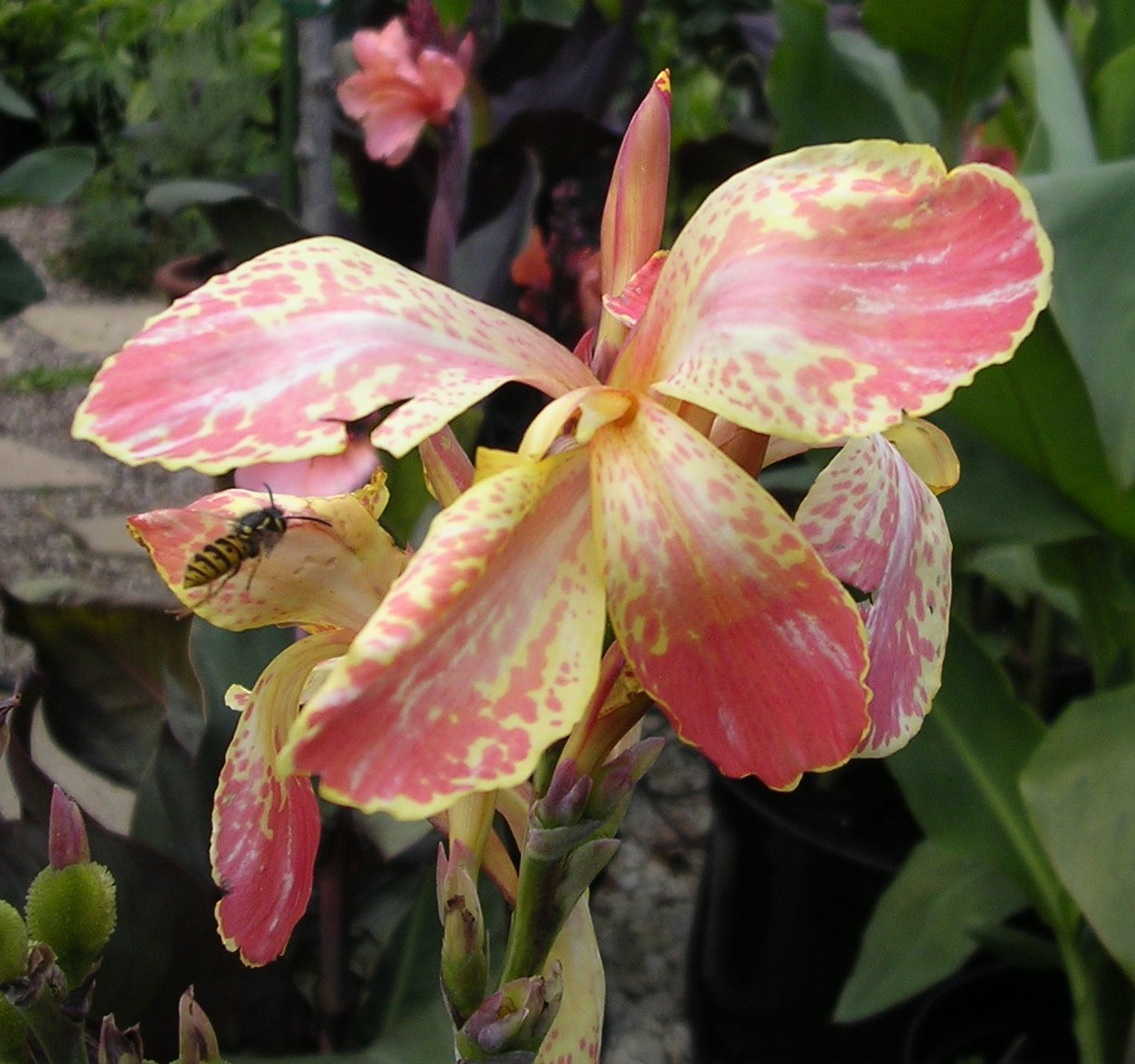
Canna 'Percy Lancaster', Sydney Percy-Lancaster

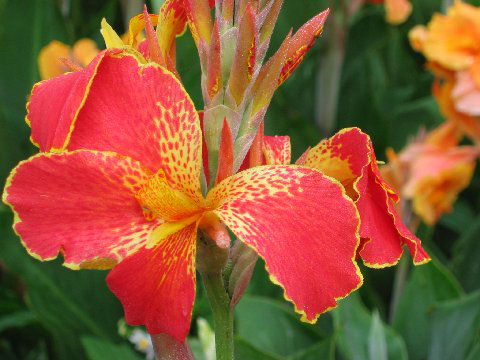
Canna 'Pretty Butterfly', M. Sheppard

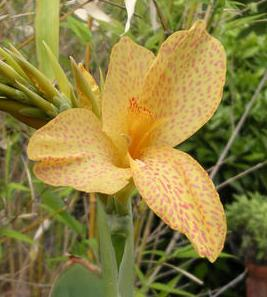
Canna 'Souvenir de Madame Nardy', Crozy

== Italian group ==
A cultivar group with large, fragile staminodes. Flowers are arranged somewhat loosely, with wide petals, so wide that there is no space between them, when arranged formally. The labellum (lip) is larger, or at least as large, as the staminodes, unlike the other groups where it is smaller and sometimes curled. The stamen is also much wider than that in the other cultivar groups.

Also, used to be called the orchid flowering cannas, or C. × orchiodes L.H. Bailey garden species, although such "pretend" species are now deprecated in favour of Cultivar Groups. In any event, it is difficult to see the similarity between this group and orchids.

Most of this group obtained its larger sized flowers from the introduction of Canna flaccida in the early 1890s by Dr Sprenger in Naples, Italy followed shortly afterwards by Luther Burbank in California, United States, with the same cross.

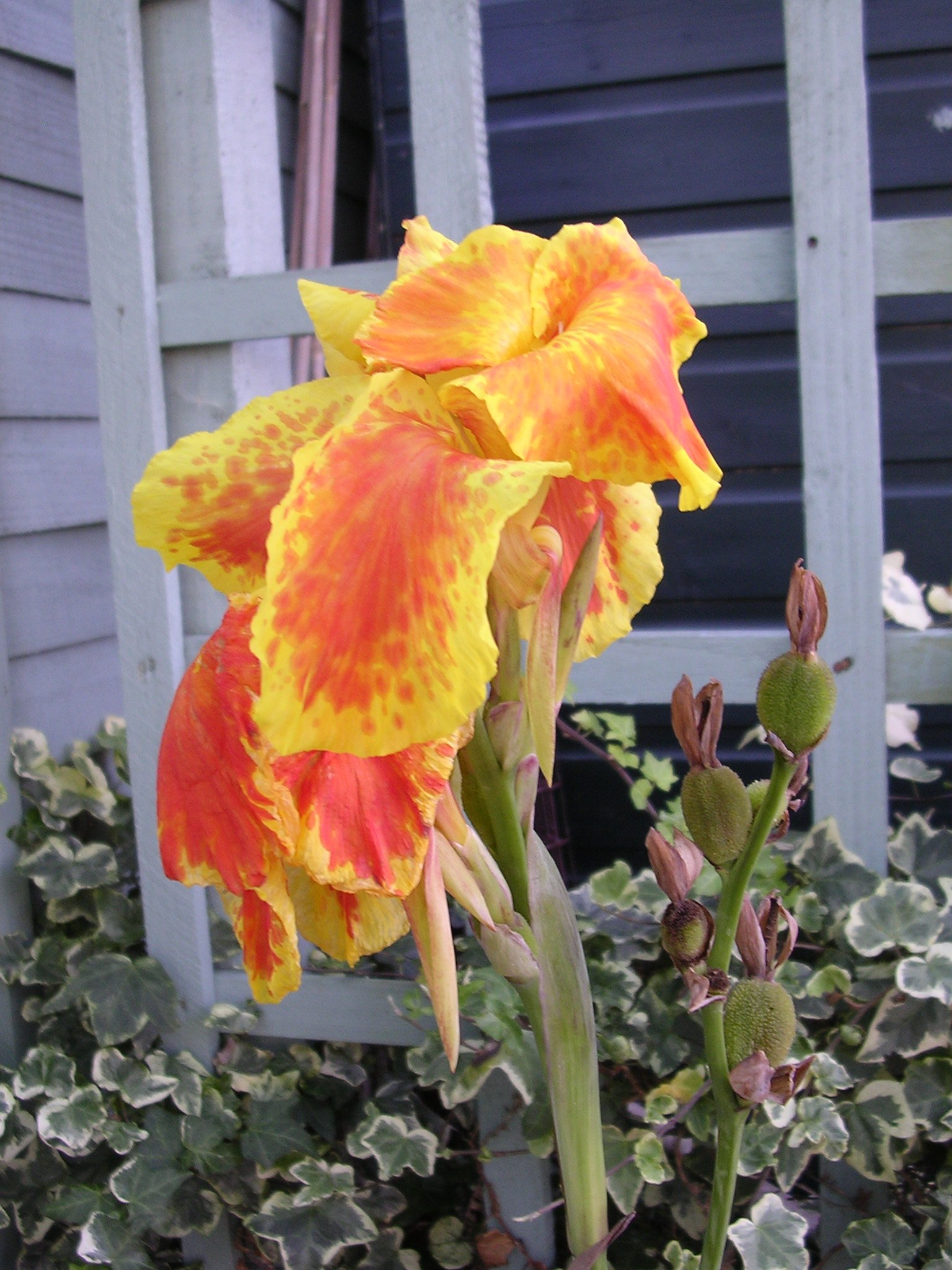
Canna 'Allemania', Sprenger 1896

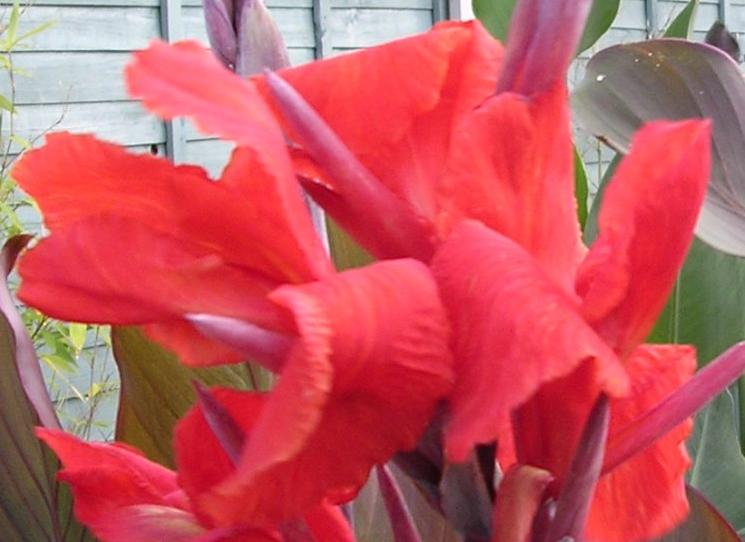
Canna 'American Flag', Wintzer 1902

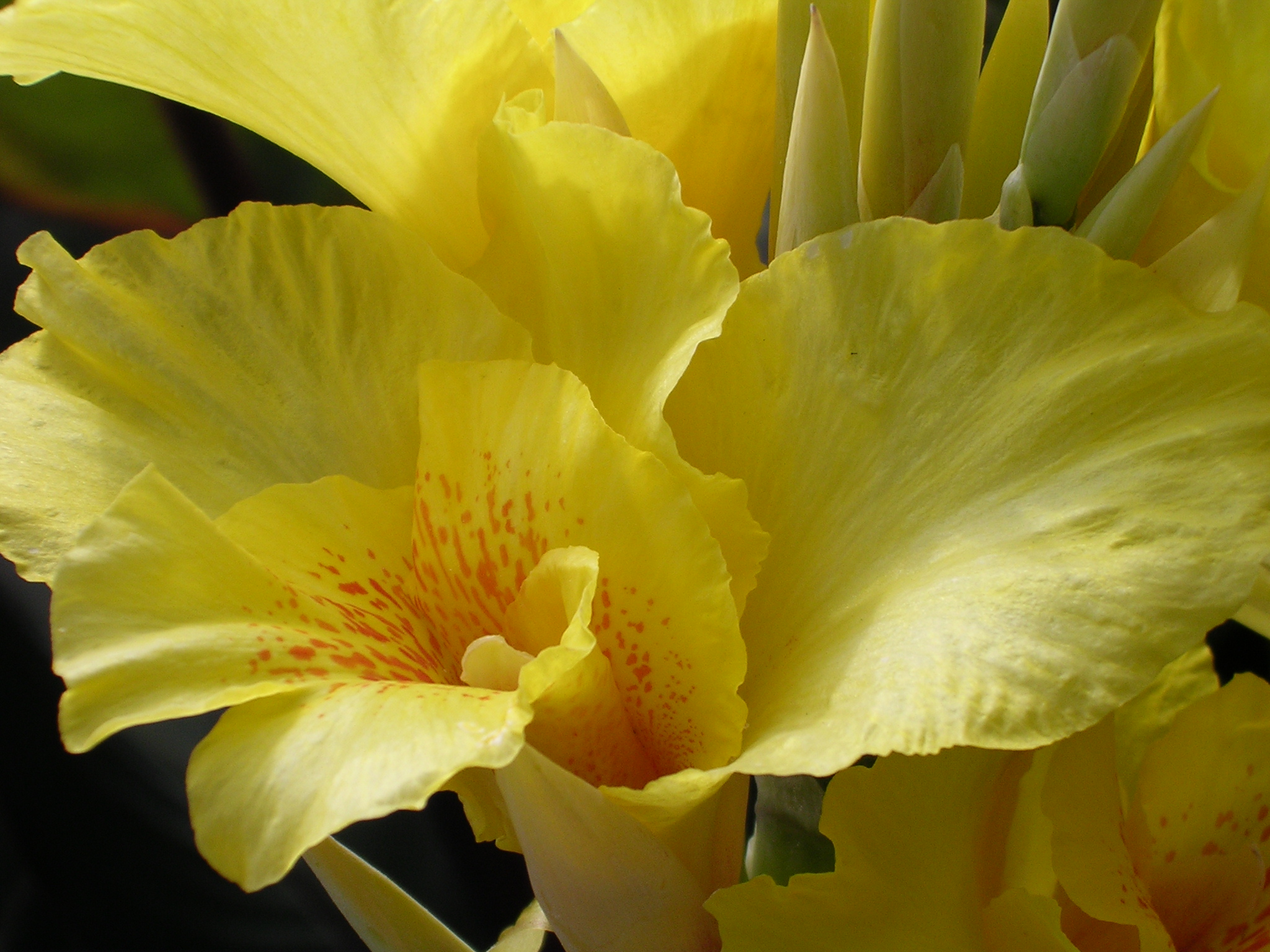
Canna 'Austria', Sprenger 1893

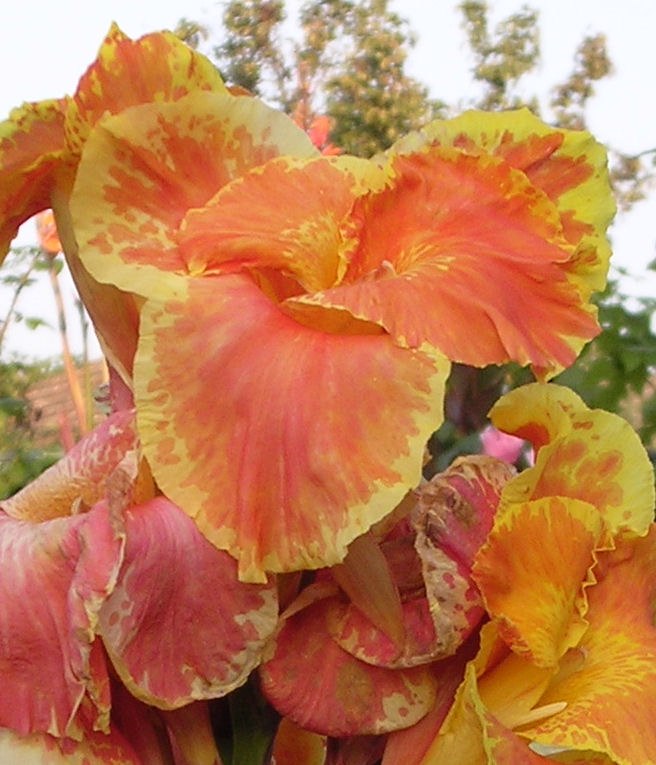
Canna 'Bavaria', Sprenger 1895

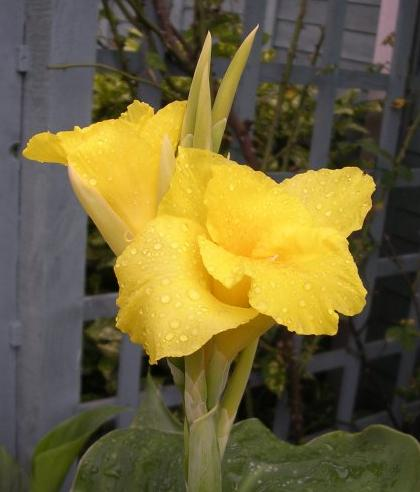
Canna 'Burbank', Burbank 1895

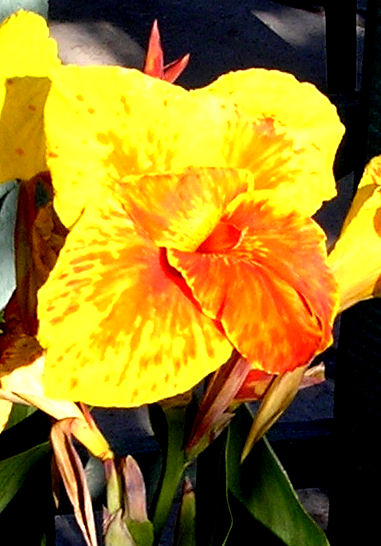
Canna 'Burgundia', Sprenger 1896

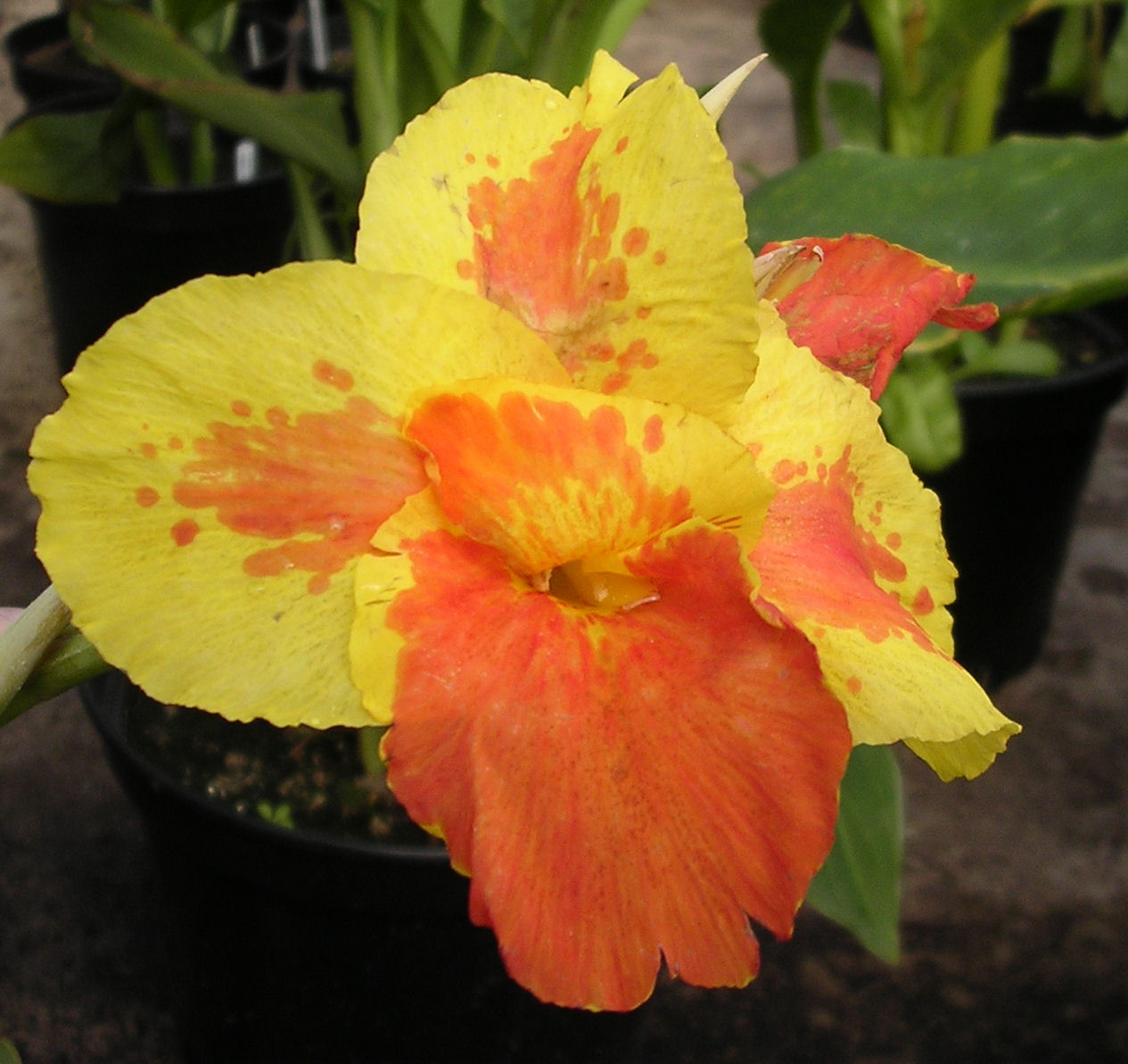
Canna 'Italia', Sprenger 1893

Canna 'Mrs Kate Gray'

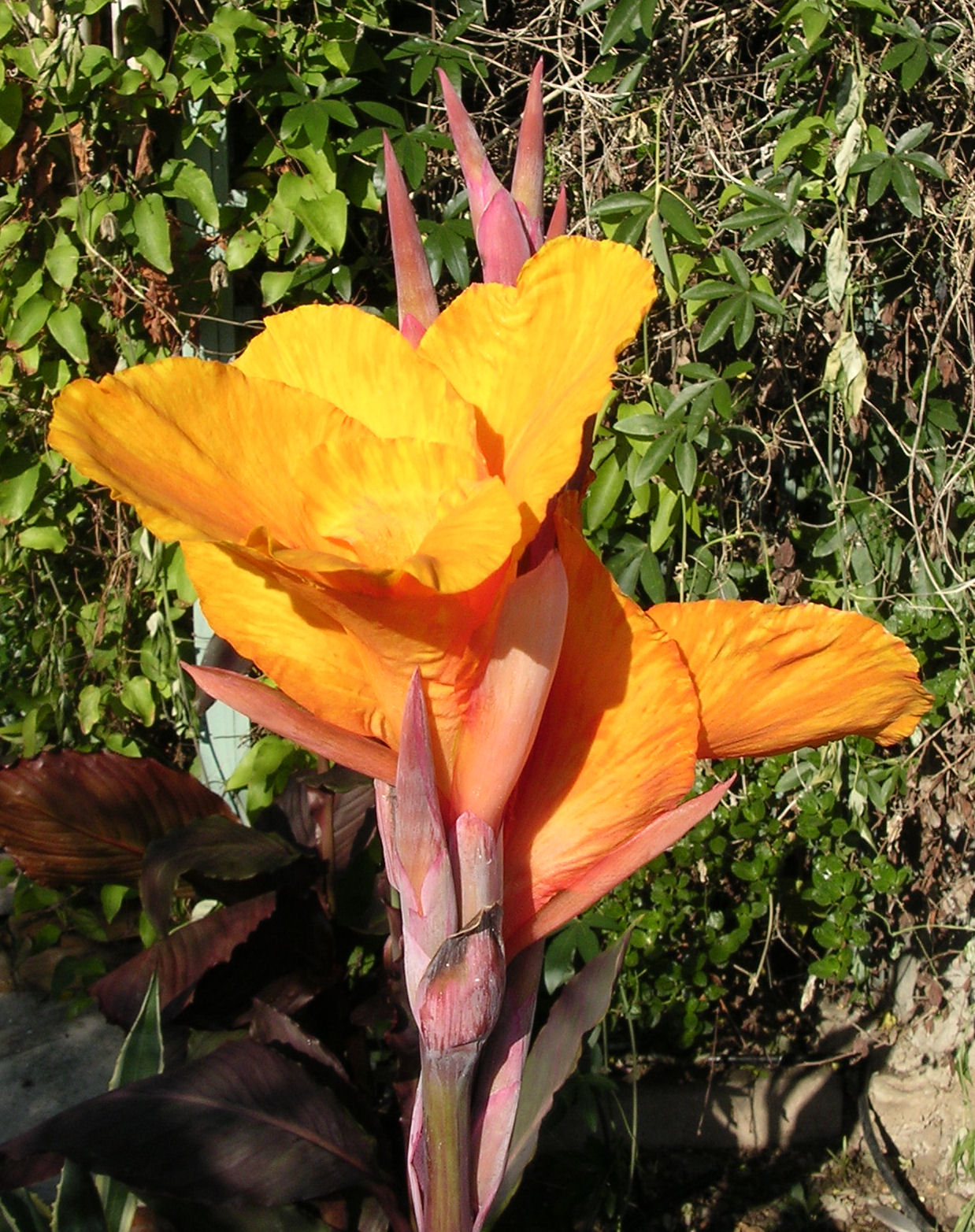
Canna 'Parténope', Sprenger 1897

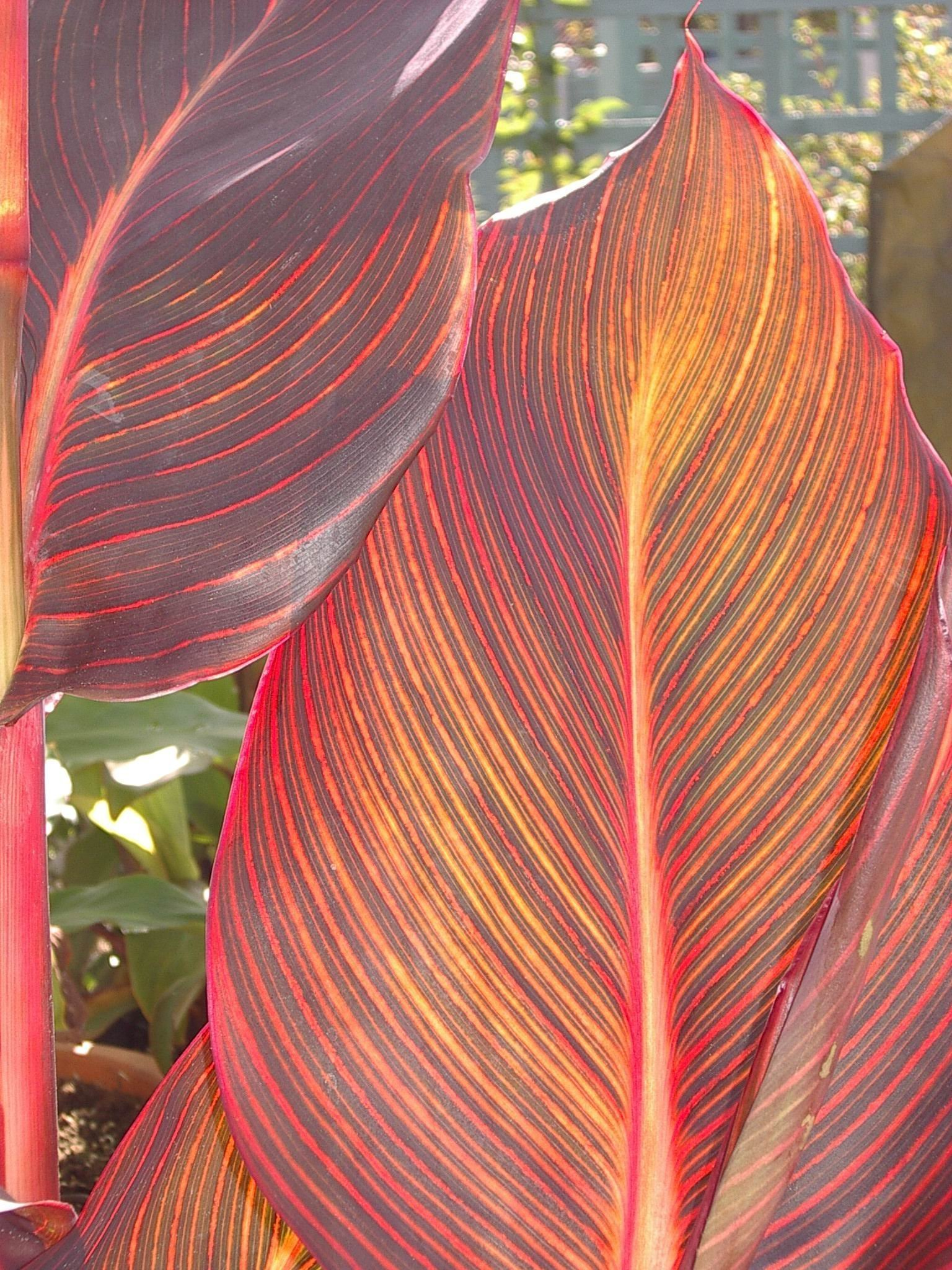
Canna (Variegated Group) 'Phasion'

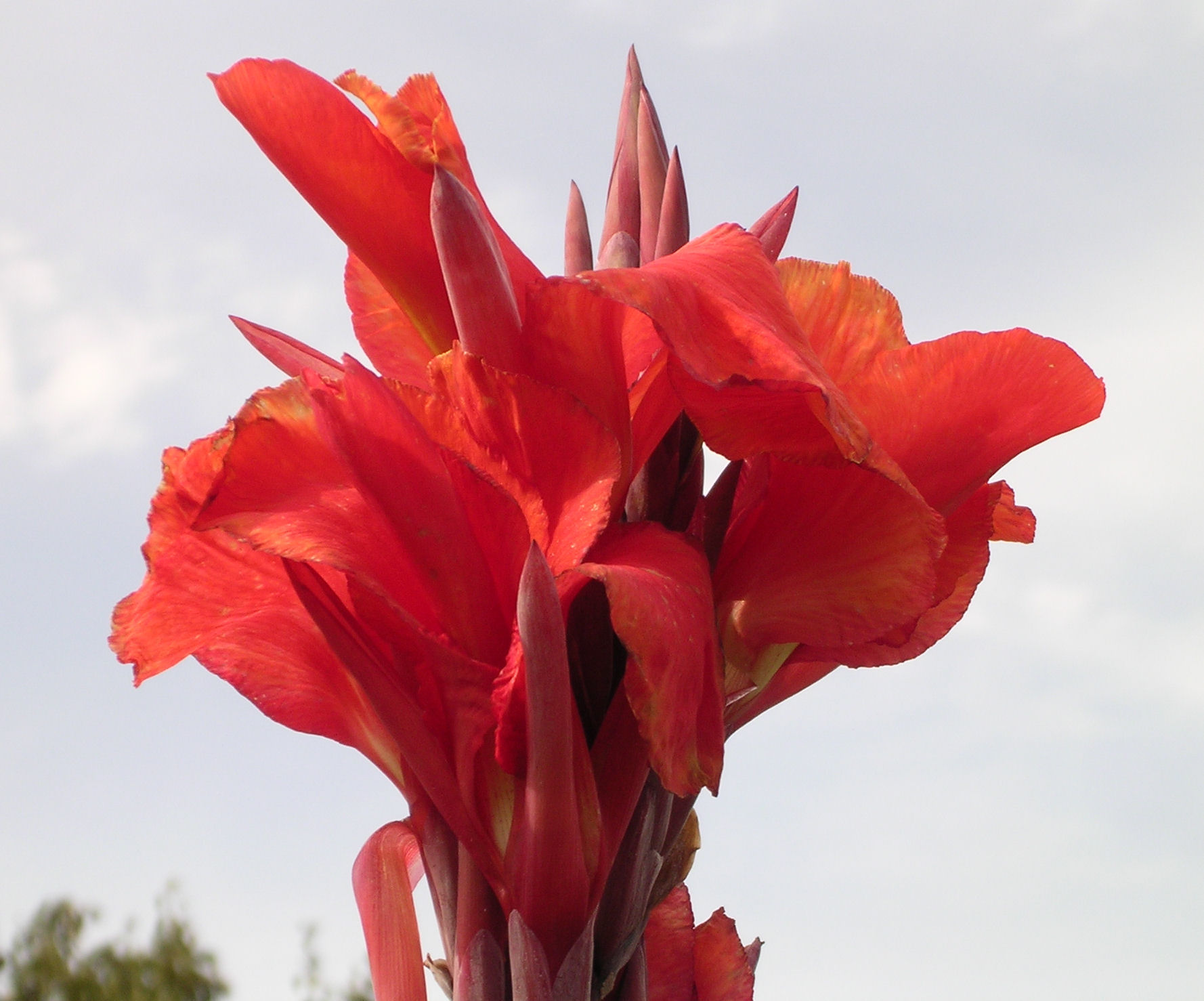
Canna 'Roi Humbert'

Canna 'Roma', Sprenger 1896

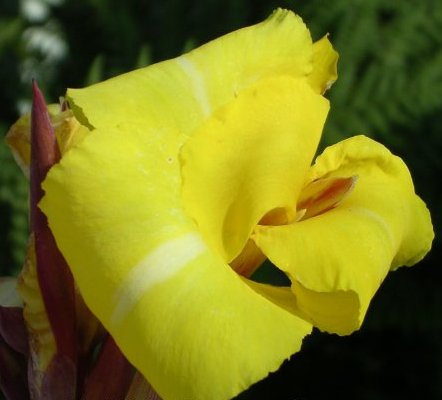
Canna (Variegated Group) 'Trinacria Variegata'

Canna 'Uncle Sam' Wintzer

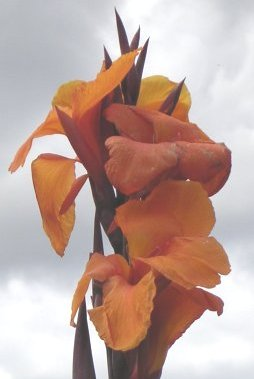
Canna 'Wyoming' Wintzer

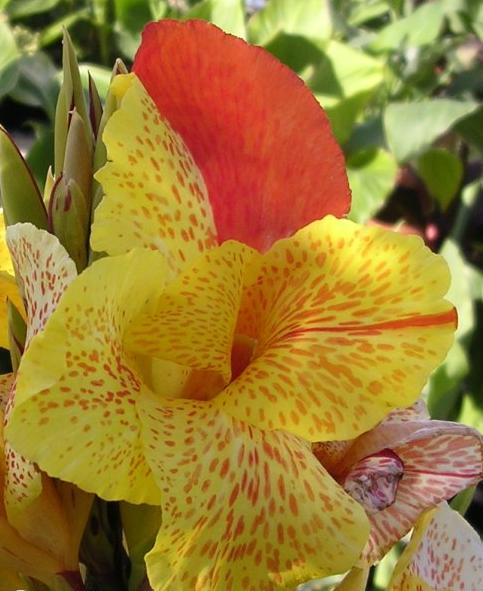
Canna 'Yellow King Humbert' Burbank

== Australian group ==
The result of a crossing of a Foliage Group seed parent with an Italian Group pollen parent (C. 'Red Stripe' x C. 'Bengal Tiger'), which resulted in the very large leaves of the Foliage Group allied with large flowers.

== Premier group ==
This grouping contains cultivars that have a large, circular shape, without gaps between the staminodes when ordered. These are derived from triploids and crosses with the Italian Group cultivars.

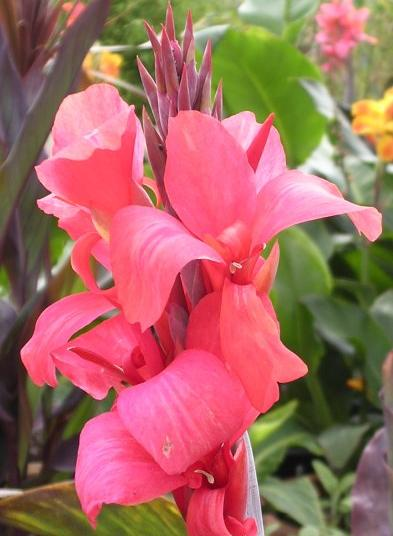
Canna 'Aida', Howard & Smith 1920s

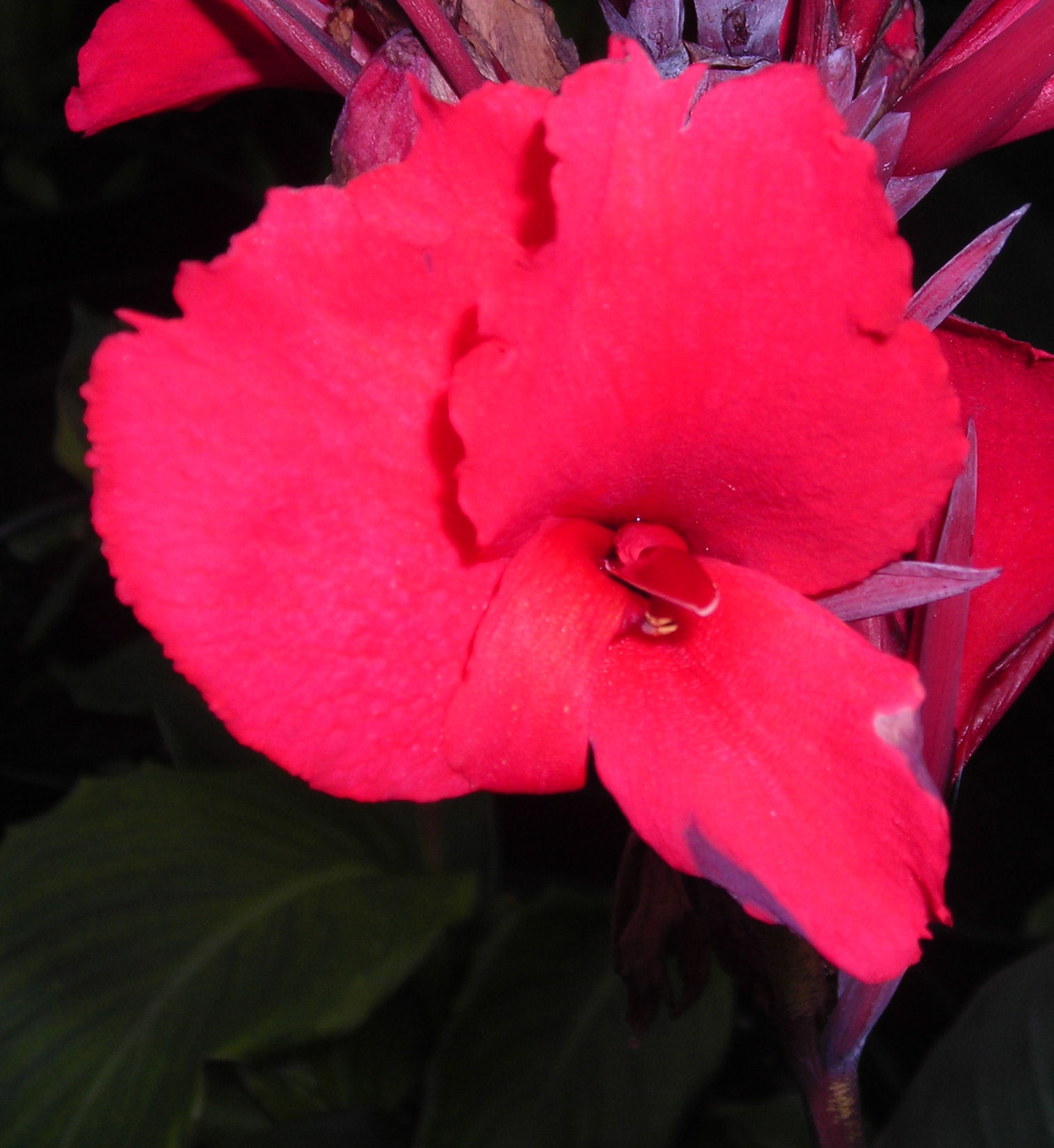
Canna 'Alfred Young', Dalebö 2005

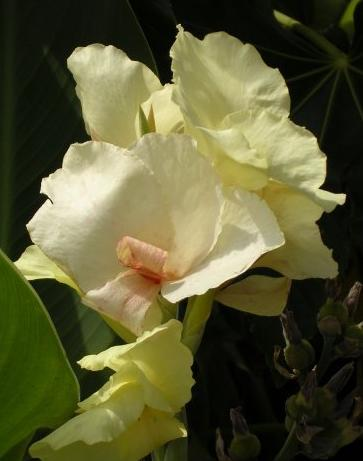
Canna 'Eureka'

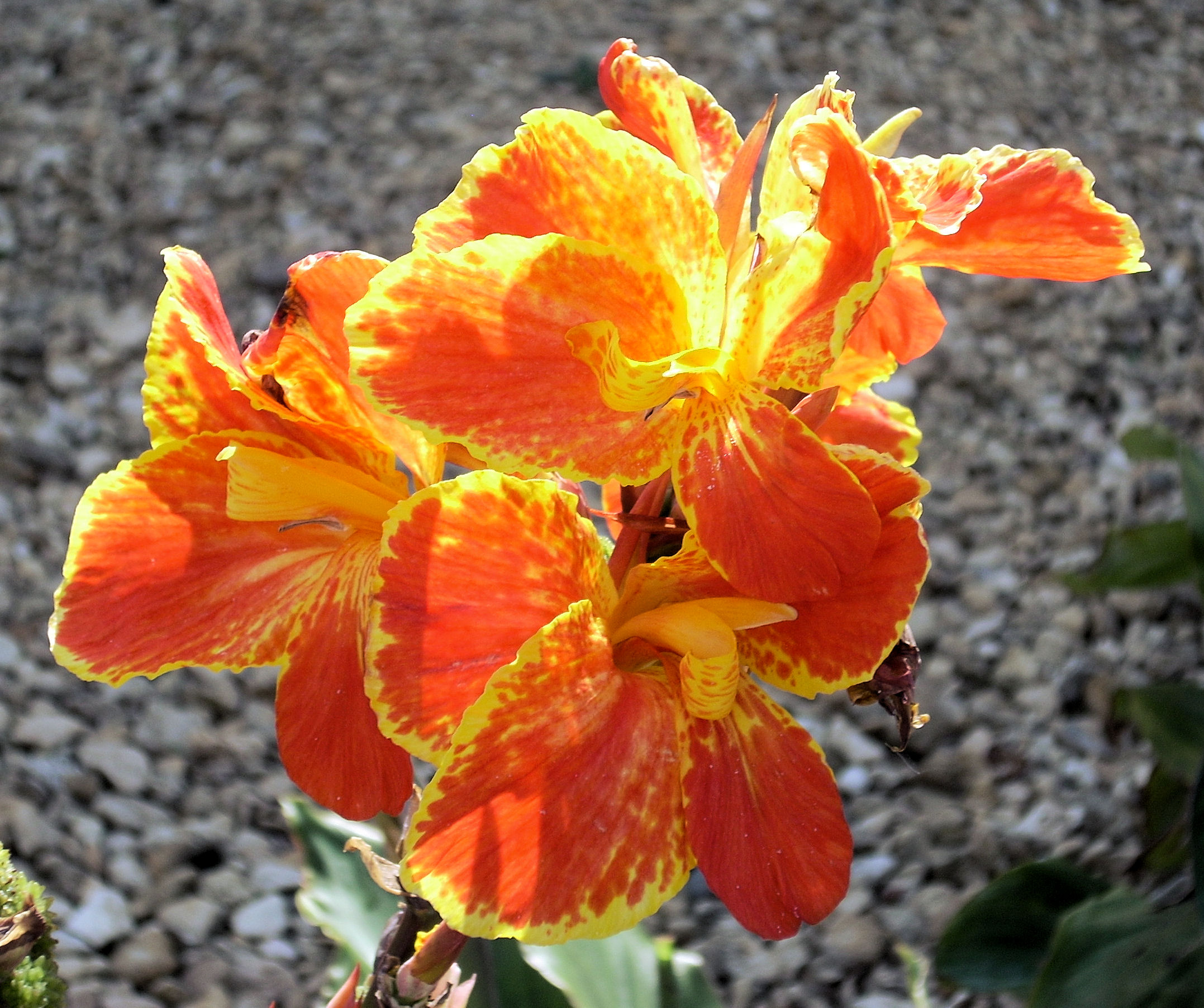
Canna 'Karla Dalebö', Dalebö 2007

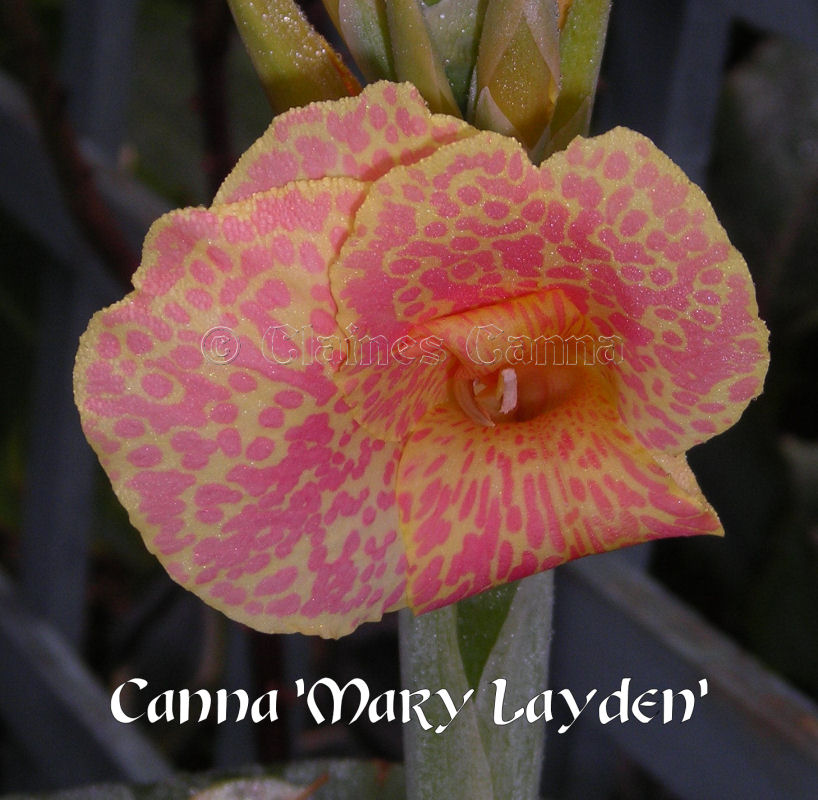
Canna 'Mary Layden', Dalebö 2005

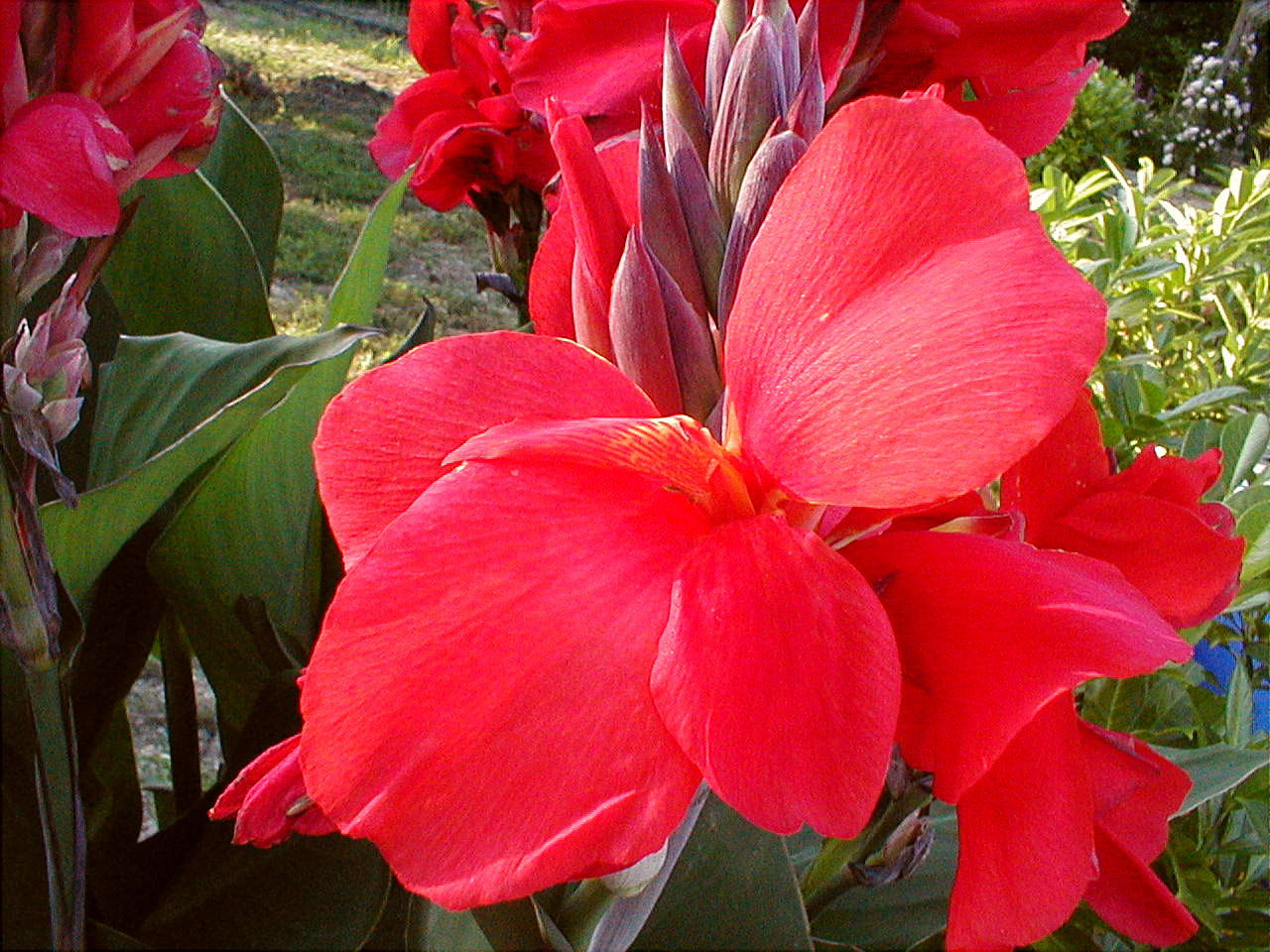
Canna 'The President', Wintzer 1920

== Variegated group ==
Cultivars with variegated foliage, regardless of what other Group they may belong to.

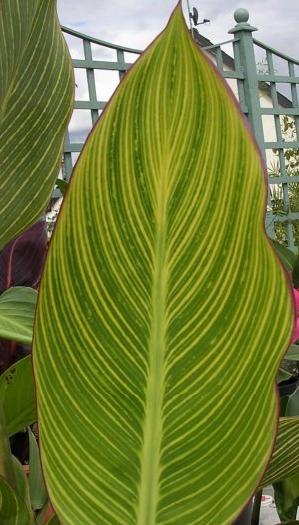
Canna (Italian Group) 'Bengal Tiger'

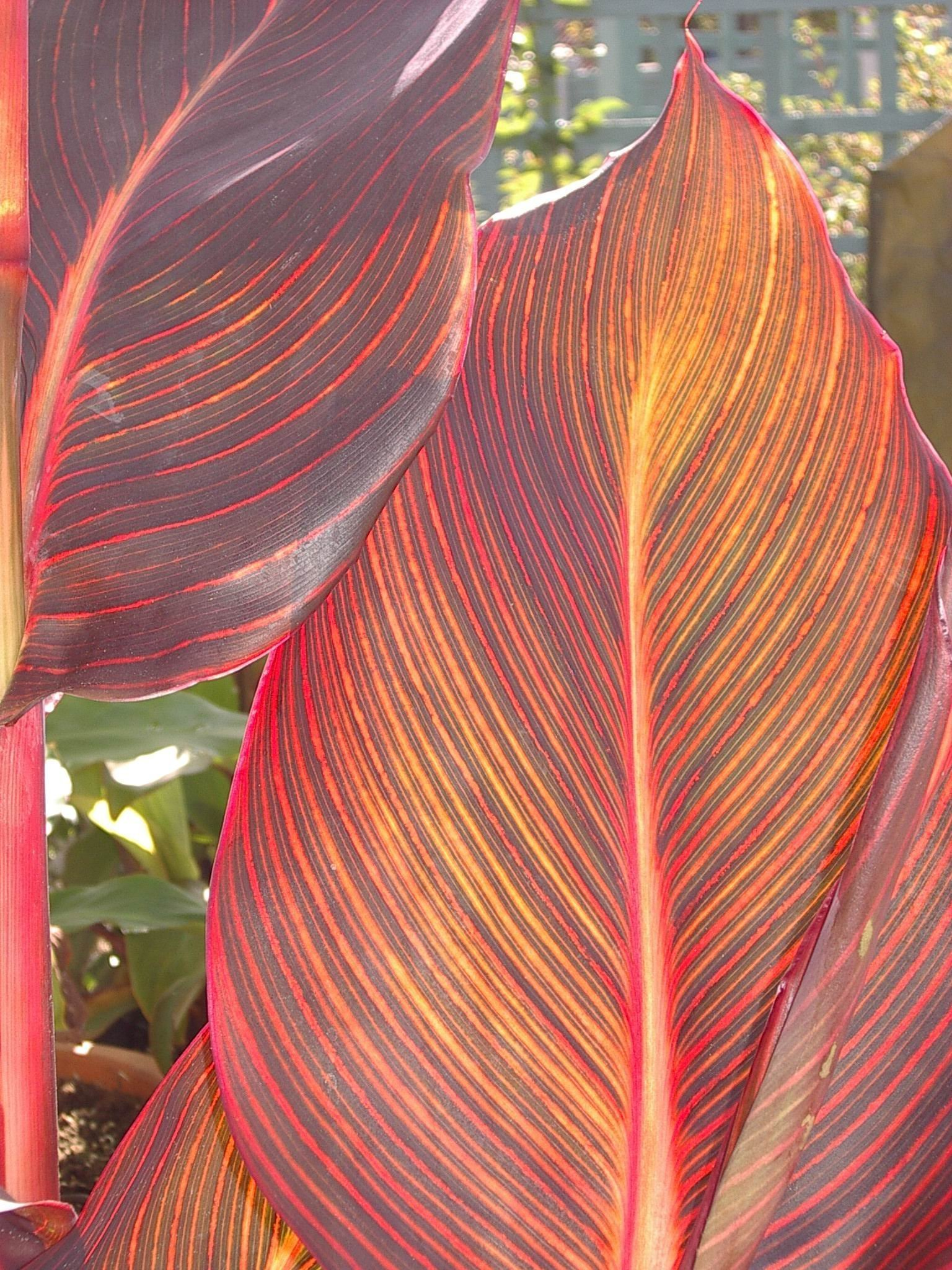
Canna (Italian Group) 'Phasion'

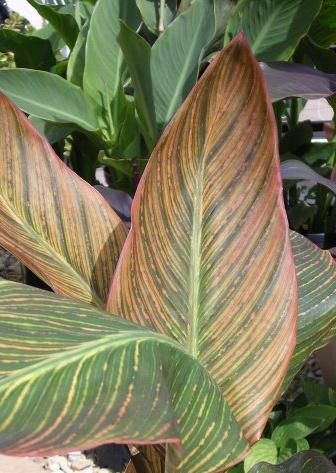
Canna (Italian Group) (Miniature Group) 'Pringle Bay', Bloch

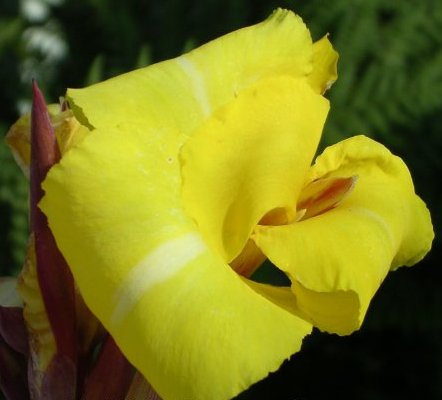
Canna (Italian Group) 'Trinacria Variegata'

== Conservatory group ==
The growing conditions in a conservatory are quite specialised and do not suit many cultivars, this group have been selected for thriving in this environment, required features being plant vigor, early flowering, foliar appearance, self-cleaning ability and good propagation qualities. The originator of this group was Robert Armstrong (geneticist) while he was working at Longwood Gardens in the United States in 1967.

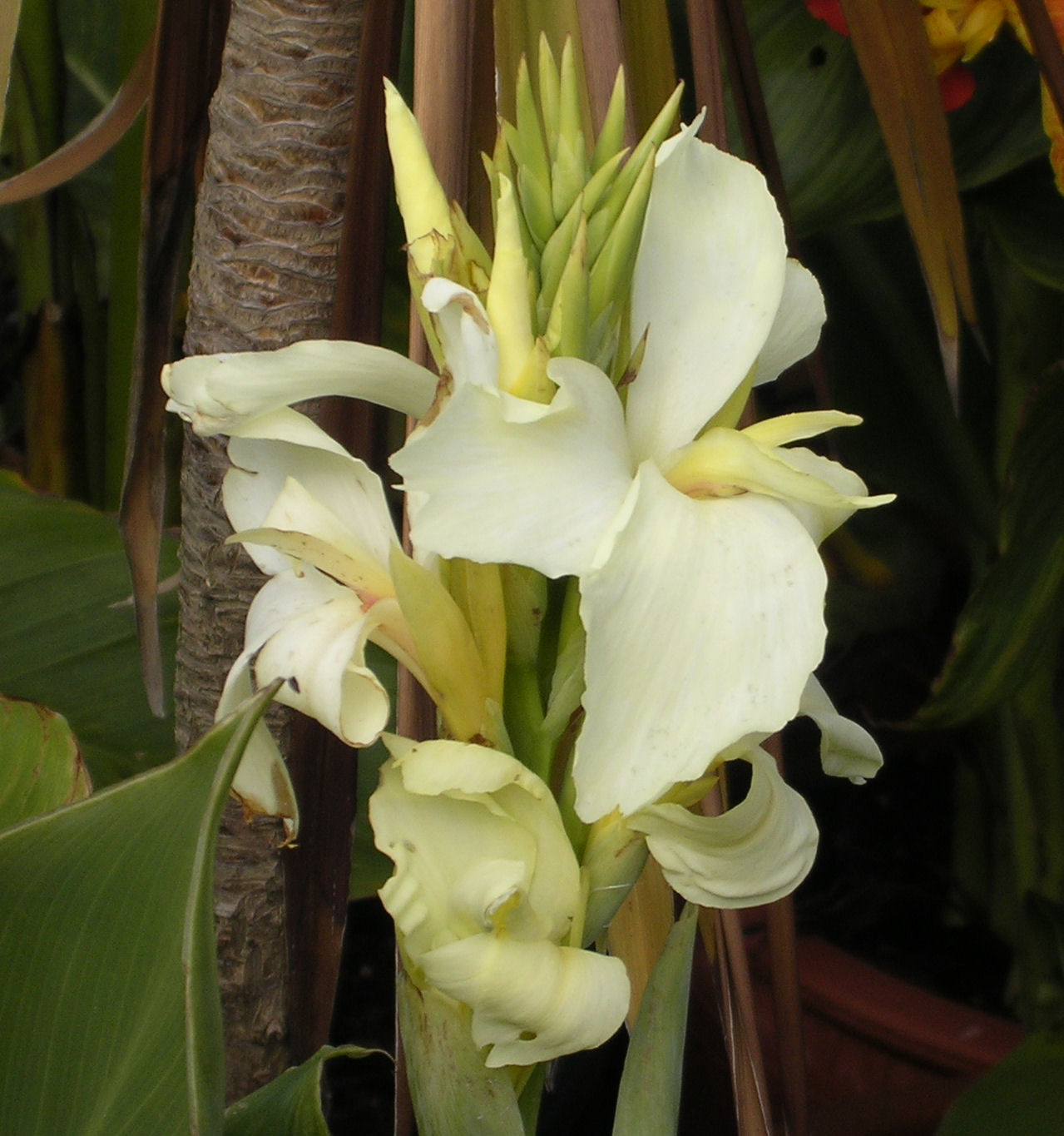
Canna 'Chesapeake', Armstrong

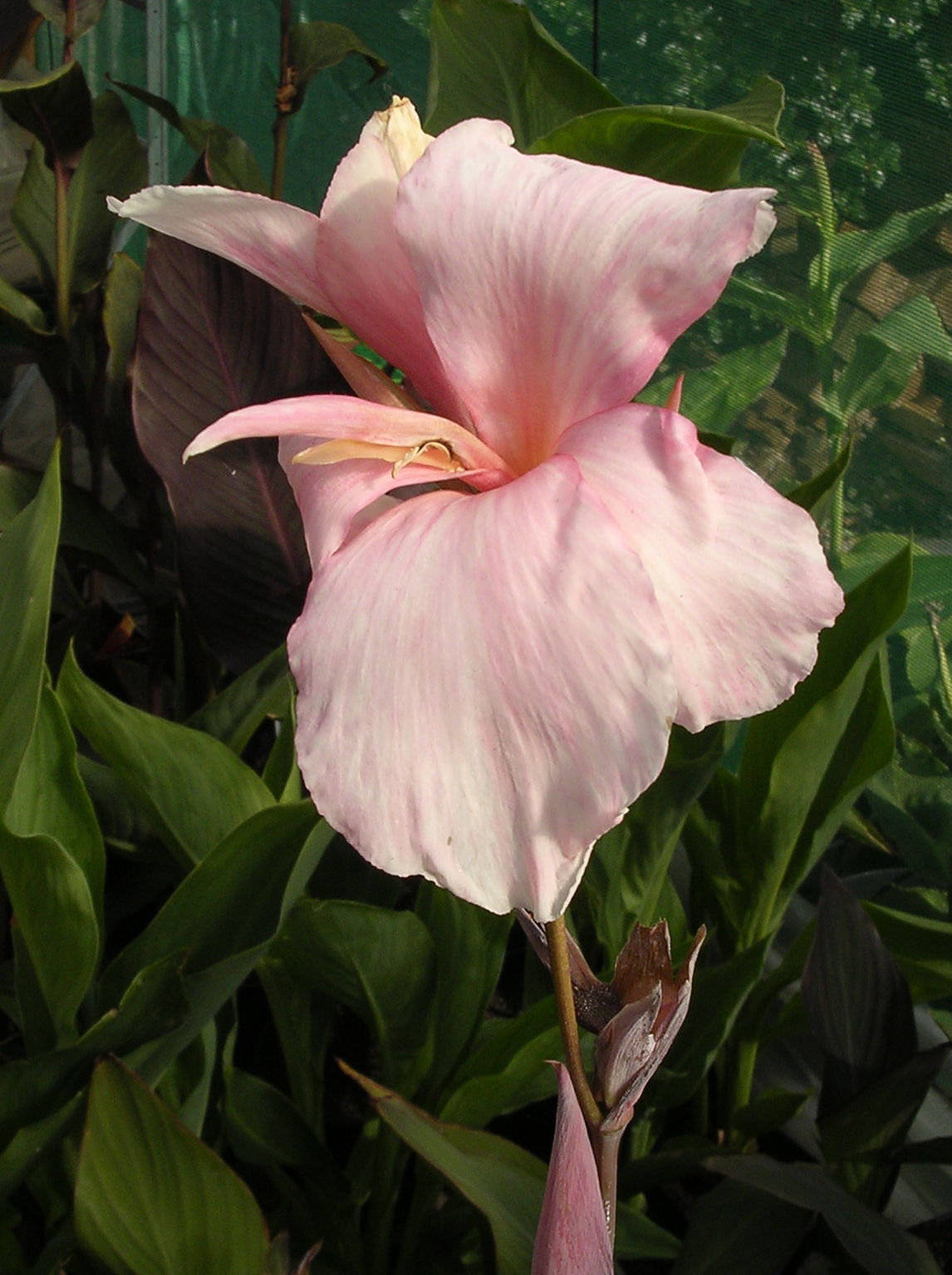
Canna 'Constitution', Armstrong

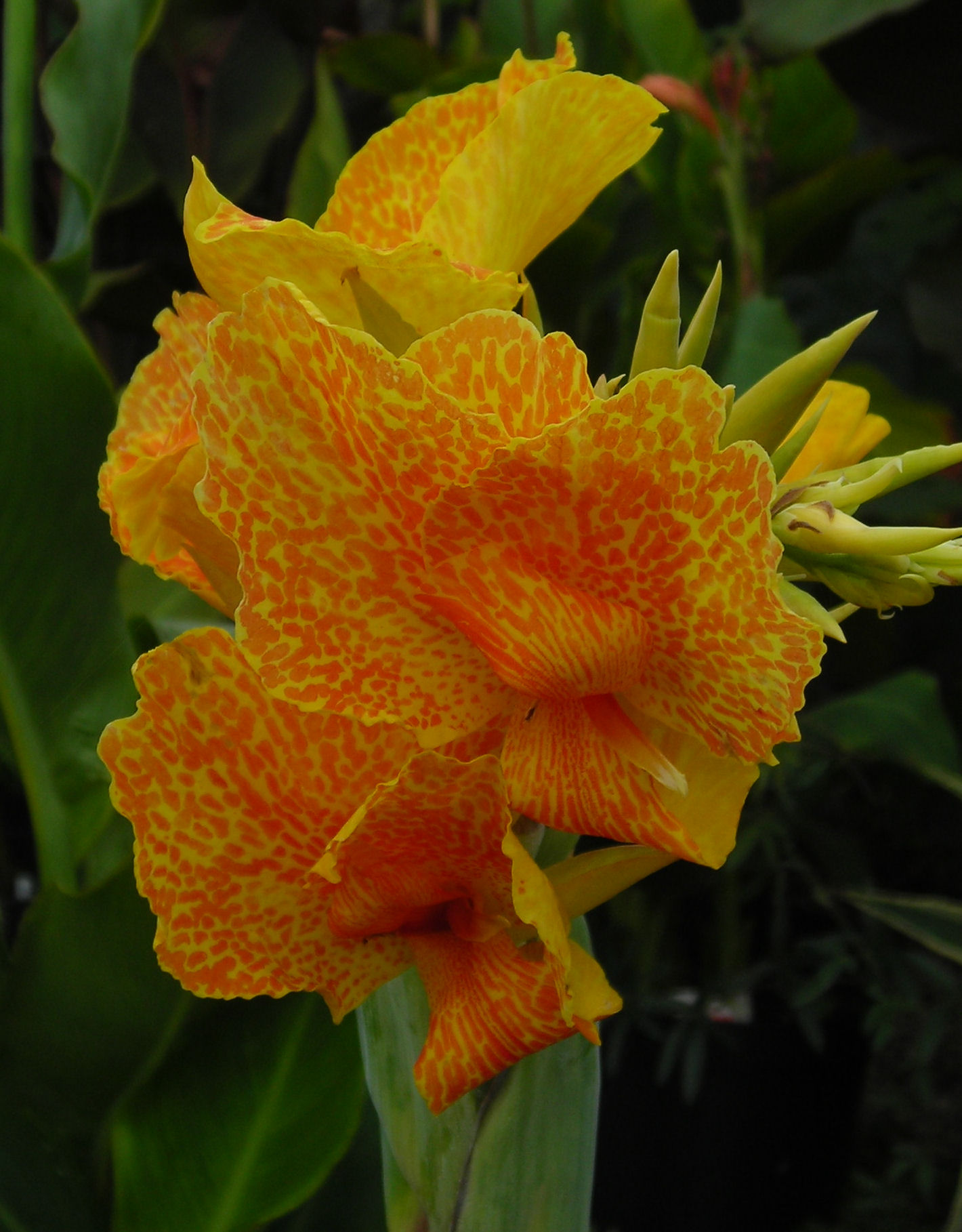
Canna 'Lenape', Armstrong

== Aquatic group ==
Cultivars that thrive as marginal water plants. Characteristically, they will have lance-shaped foliage and long, thin rhizomes.

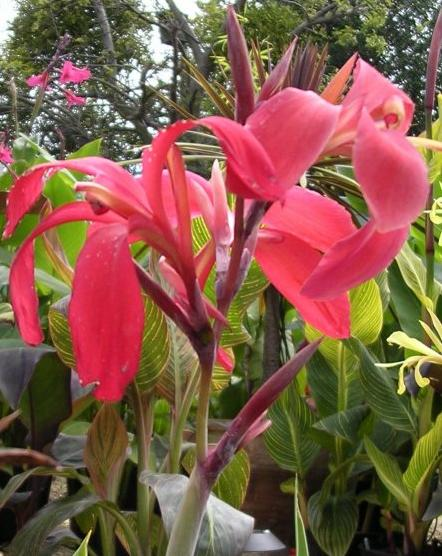
Canna 'Endeavour', Armstrong

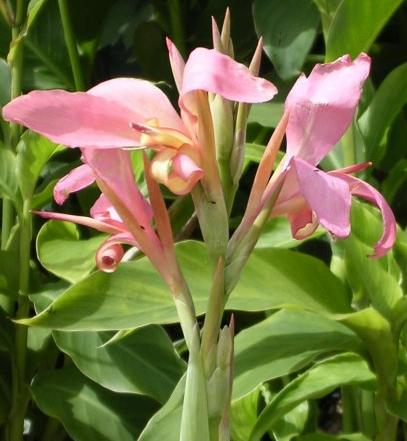
Canna 'Erebus', Armstrong

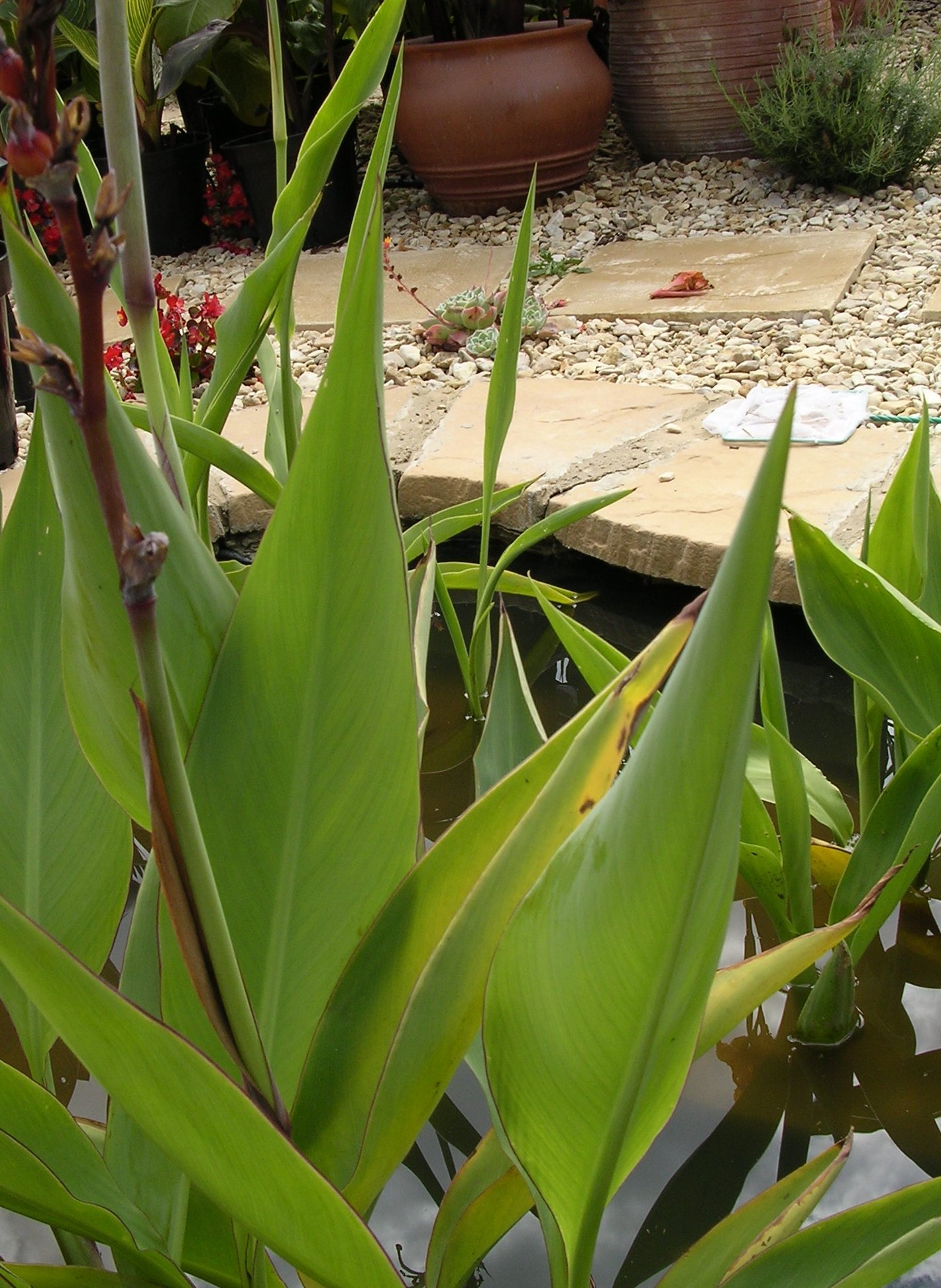
Canna 'Erebus', Armstrong

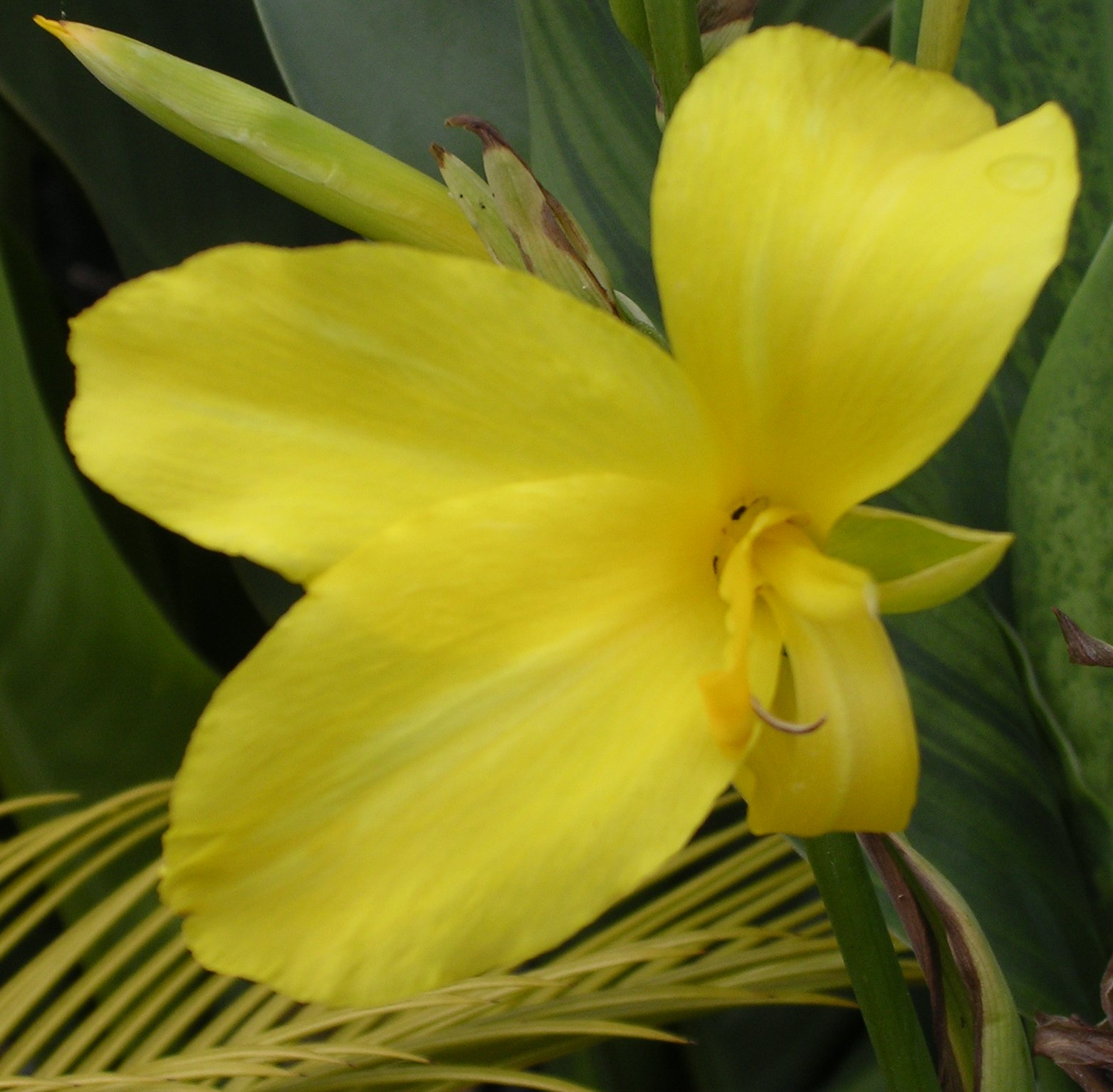
Canna 'Ra', Armstrong

== Miniature group ==
Cultivars growing under 0.5m (19") high, the flowers should be in scale to the rest of the plant.

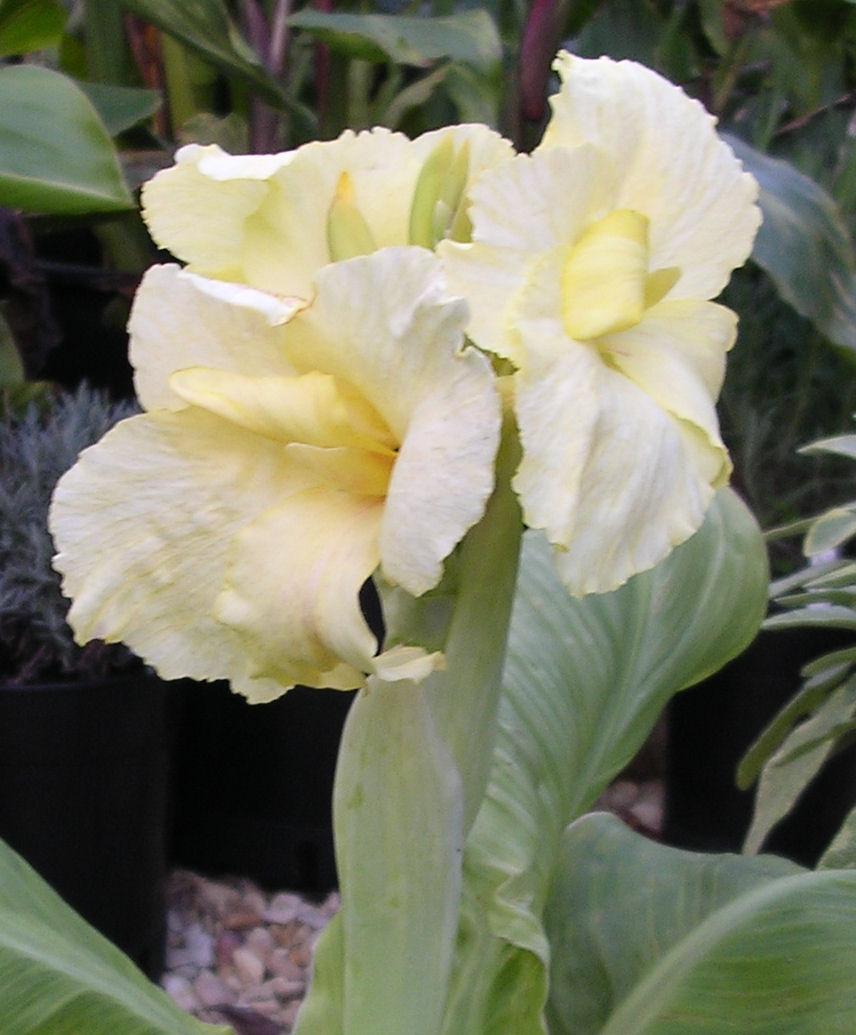
Canna 'Puck'

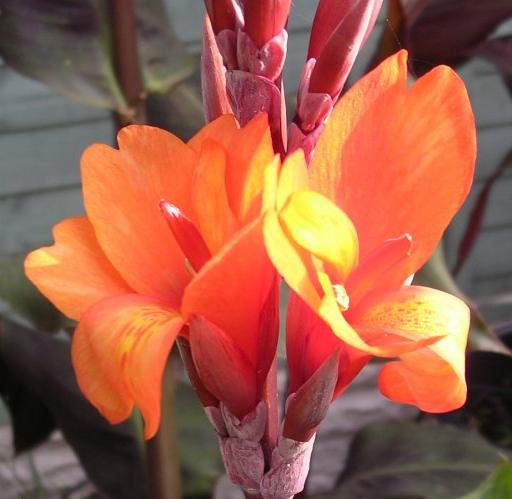
Canna 'Flameche'

Canna 'Florian' B. Yorke 2007

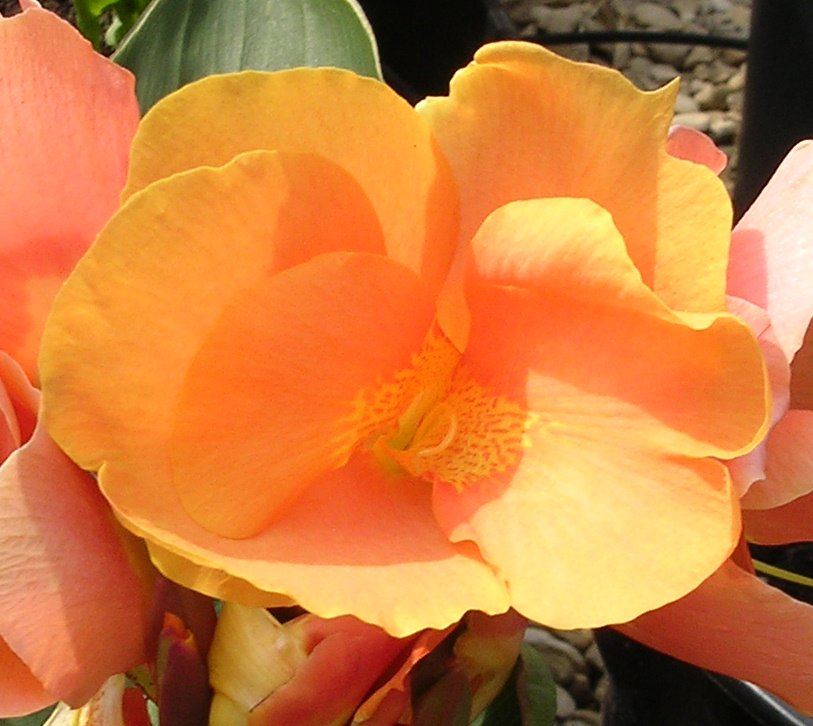
Canna 'Oberon', Dalebö 2006

== Agriculture group ==
Cultivars grown selectively for agricultural usage, normally for their very large rhizomes and a high starch yield. See Canna Agriculture Group for more details.

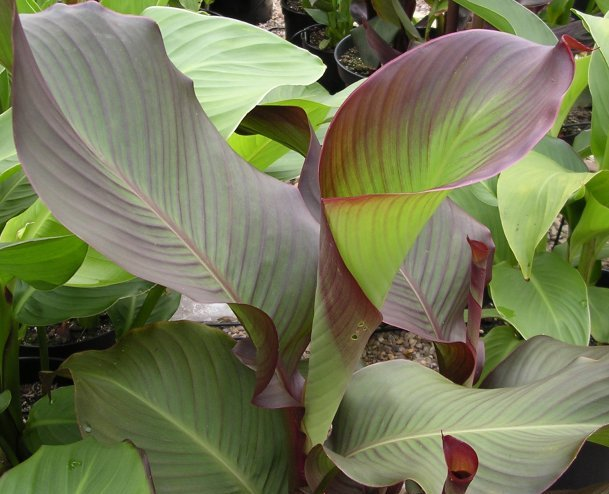
Canna 'Achira Dark'

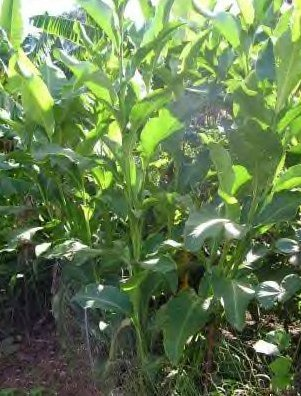
Canna 'Queensland Arrowroot'

== Musaefolia Group ==
The Musaefolia Group, having large leaves and being either tall or giant in size consists of cultivars whose leaves resemble those of banana plants (genus Musa). Until this group was designated, the cultivars were considered to be members of the Foliage Group.

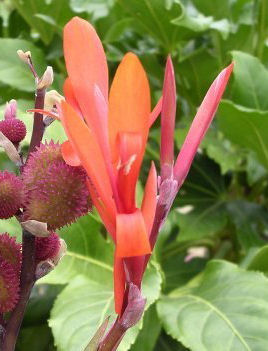
Canna 'Musaefolia Hybrida'

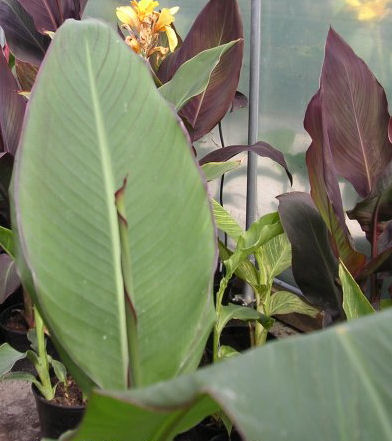
Canna 'Musaefolia Hybrida'

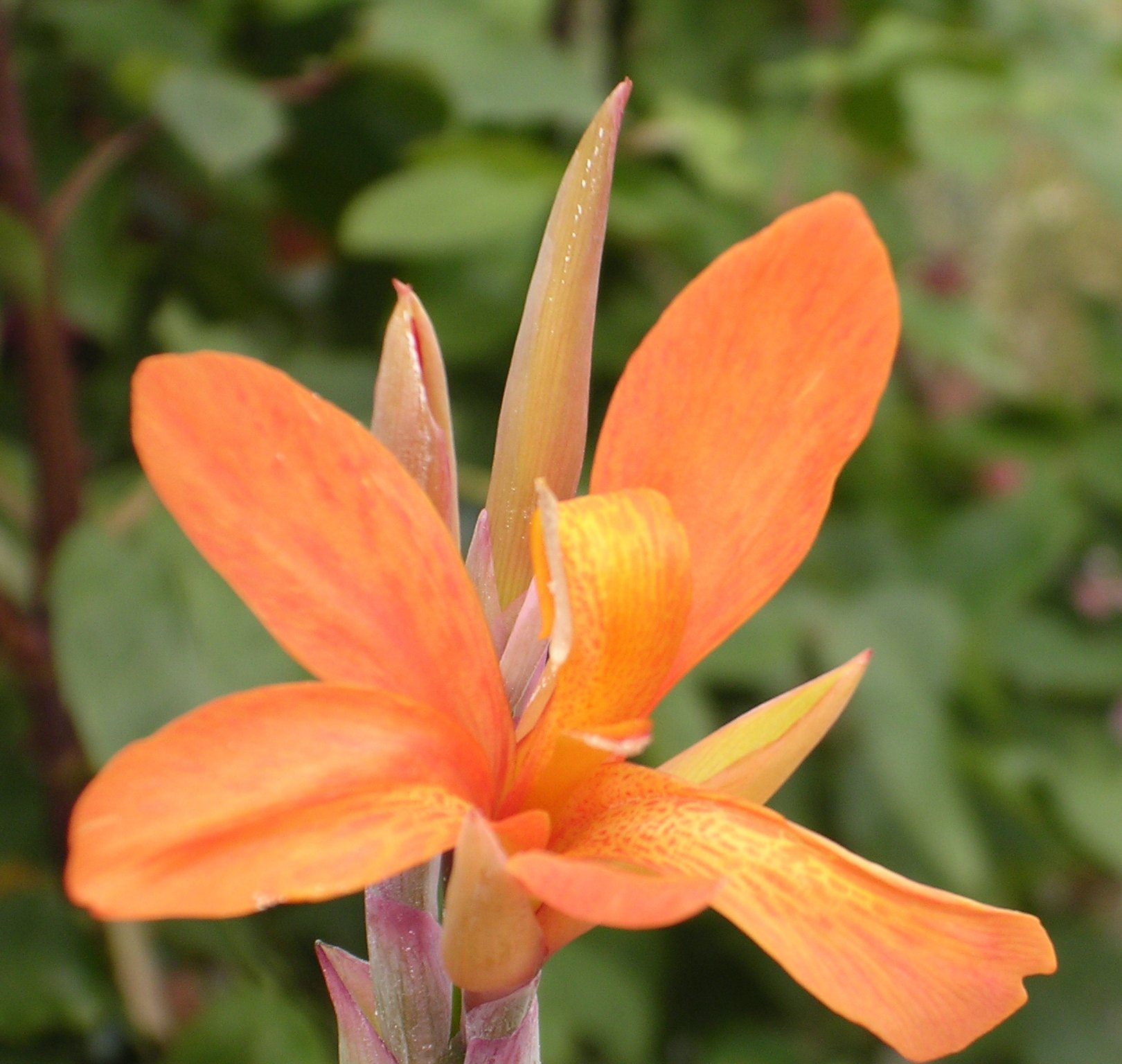
Canna 'Musaefolia Peruviana'

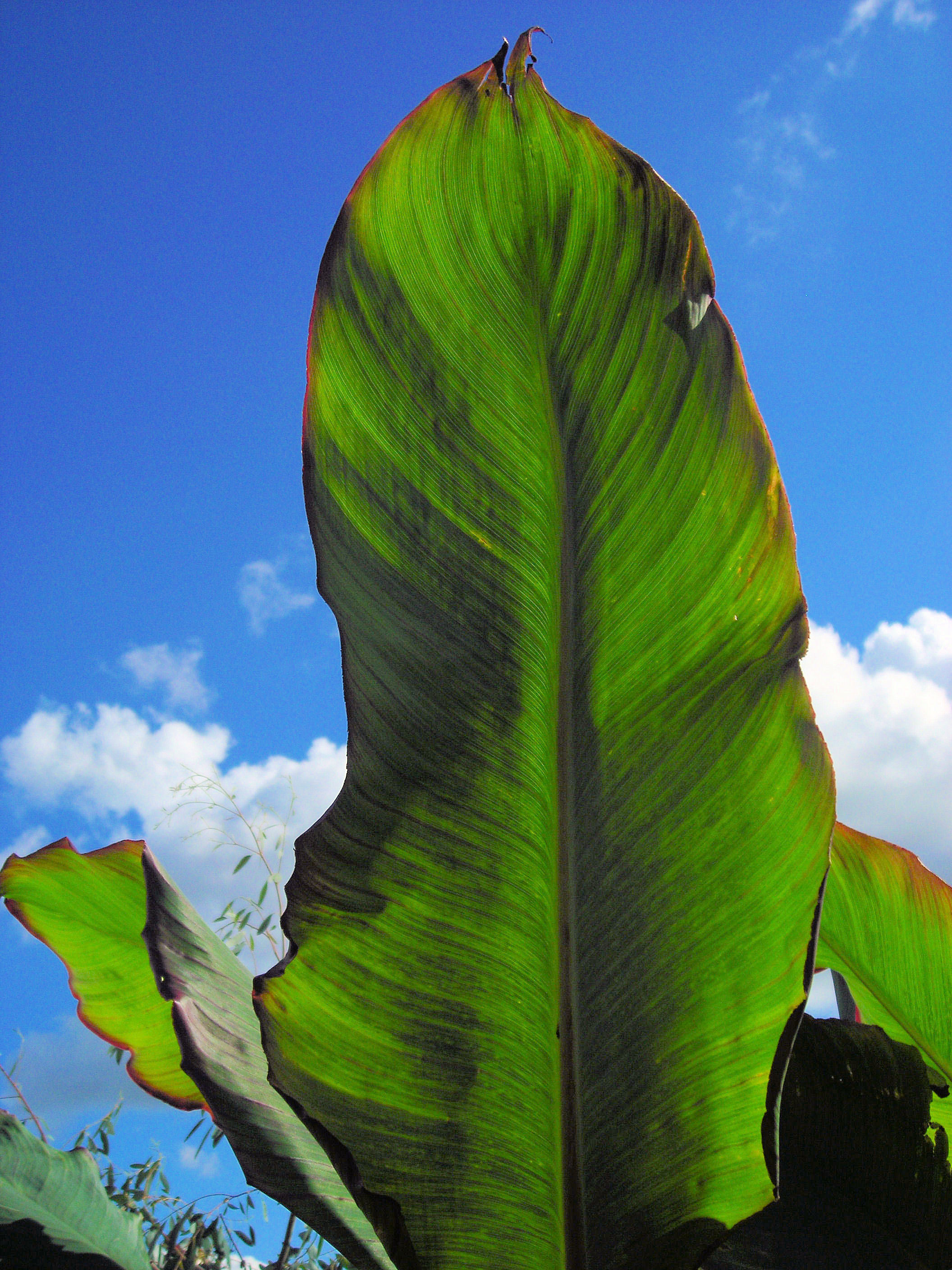
Canna 'Musaefolia Peruviana'

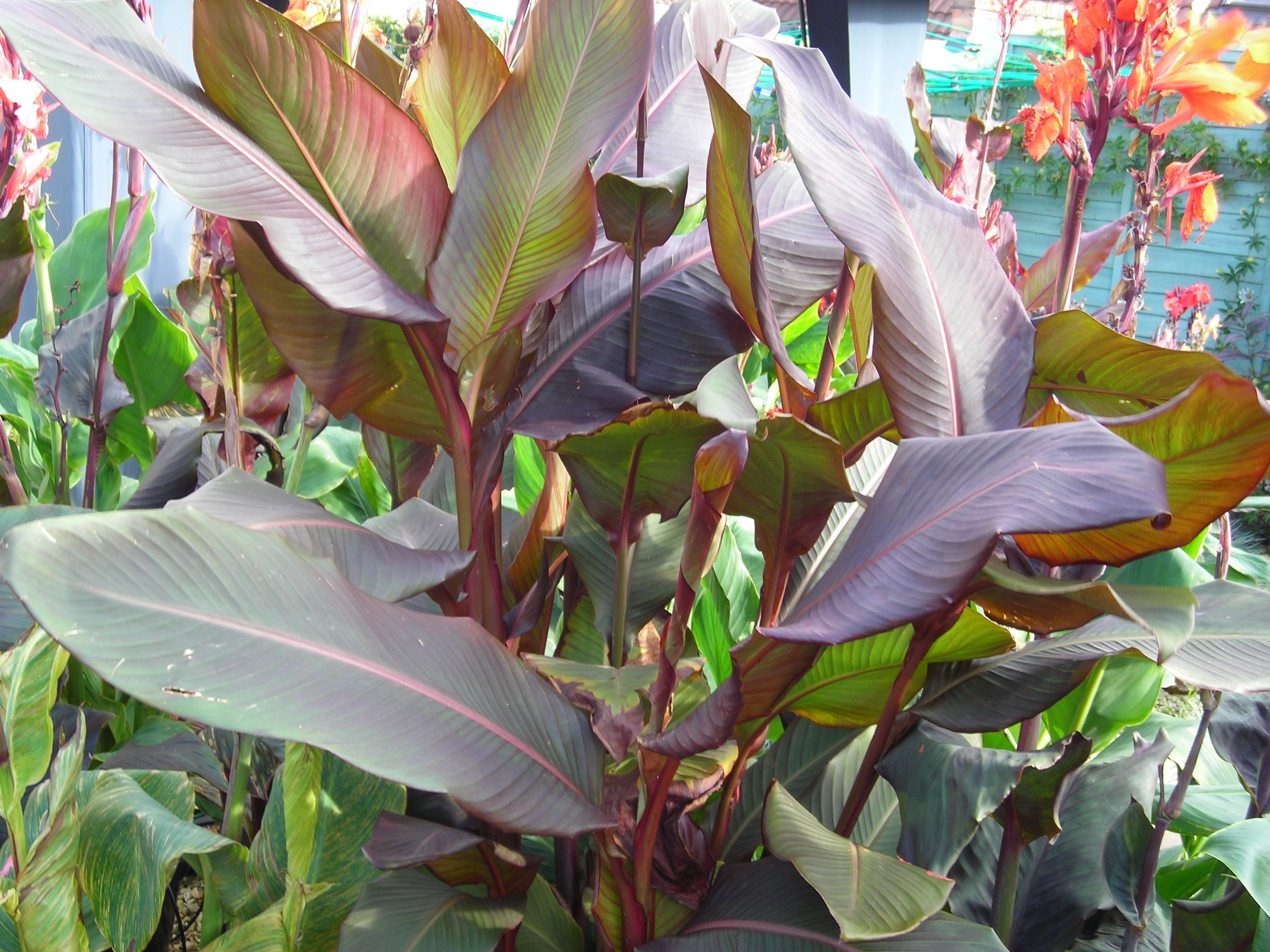
Canna 'Musaefolia Rubra'

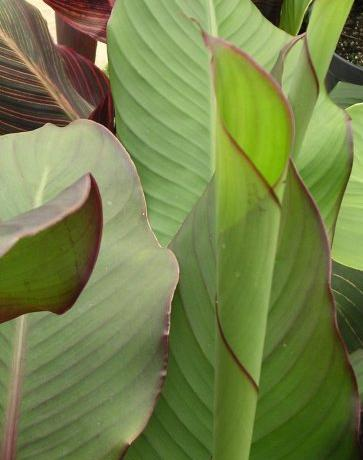
Canna 'Musaefolia Grande'

== See also ==
- List of Canna species
- List of Canna hybridists
- Lists of cultivars
