= Canna 'Trinacria Variegata' =

Flowering plant cultivar

Canna Italian Group 'Trinacria Variegata'. The earliest mention of this cultivar is in 1927, An Amateur in an Indian Garden by S. Percy-Lancaster, F.L.S., F.R.H.S., M.R.A.S., in which it was described and referred to by this name.

A small Italian Group cultivar; variegated foliage, oval shaped, white margin, spreading habit; round stems, coloured green + purple; clusters of flowers are reflexed, yellow and white, staminodes are large, edges ruffled, petals red, fully self-cleaning; seed is sterile, pollen is low fertile; rhizomes are long and thin, coloured white; tillering is average.

It has eye-catching variegated leaves, with large butter-yellow blooms, marked by this plants signature - a white stripe down the centre of each petal forming a white cross. It has variegated leaves of green with pale yellow variegation parallel to the veins.

Nurserymen folk legend has it that in 1923, or thereabouts, a consignment of Canna 'Trinacria' rhizomes was despatched to Siam, now Thailand, from a nursery in California. When it arrived at its destination and was grown out it was found to have variegated foliage. A sample was returned to the nursery with a demand for a refund or replacement as it was not what had been ordered.

This mutation was probably caused by the extreme conditions endured in transport from California to Thailand in the days before air travel. The cultivar was examined in the 1960s by Dr. Khoshoo, who stated that this was not a chimeral mutation.

== Gallery ==
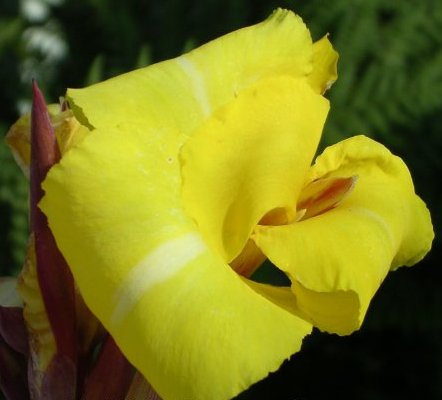
Canna 'Trinacria Variegata'

== Synonyms ==
- Canna 'Bangkok'
- Canna 'Bangkok Yellow'
- Canna 'Bankocki'
- Canna 'Bankok'
- Canna 'Christ’s Light'
- Canna 'King of Siam'
- Canna 'Minerva'
- Canna 'Nirvana'
- Canna 'Striped Beauty'
- Canna 'Striped Beauty of Bangkok'
- Canna 'variegata'
- Canna 'Variegated'

== See also ==
- Canna
- Canna 'Trinacria'
- Canna gallery
