= Canna 'Phasion' =

Flowering plant cultivar

Canna 'Phasion' is a medium sized Italian Group cultivar; green, bronze and pink variegated foliage, ovoid shaped, branching habit; oval stems, coloured red; clusters of flowers are open, tangerine-orange and burnt-red, staminodes are large, edges frilled, petals purple with farina, fully self-cleaning; seed is sterile, pollen is sterile; rhizomes are thick, up to 3 cm in diameter, coloured white and purple; tillering is average. Originally a spontaneous mutation, probably of Canna 'Wyoming', as it has been known to revert its foliage colour to that identical to that old cultivar. Sold in the US and elsewhere as Canna Tropicanna®, it was protected under US Plant Patent #10,569. Because the patent was issue on 1998-08-25, it has now expired and propagation is now allowed. The plant can be sold under its cultivar name Phasion.

== Gallery ==
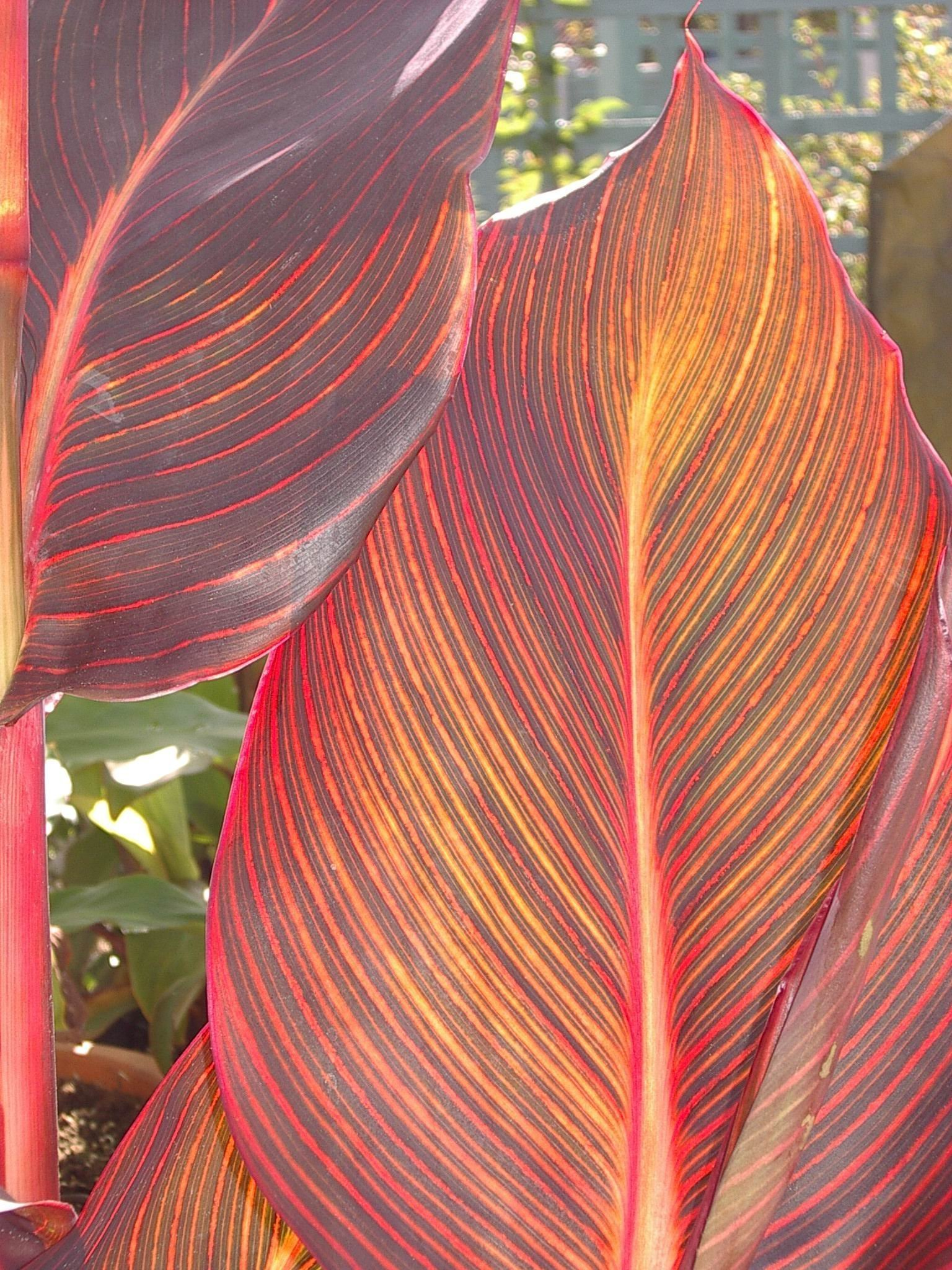

== Origin ==
The earliest record is dated 1955 in Rhodesia, now Zimbabwe, in the garden of a gentleman called Mr Rademeyer in the city of Bulawayo. The cultivar was already in the garden when he moved into the house.

== History ==
This cultivar has been subject to much legal activity, details of which are available in the link below.

== Synonyms ==
- Canna 'Andaloucia', - confined to Europe
- Canna 'Durban' - confined to Europe. There is a cultivar with this same name grown in the US, but it is distinctly different.
- Canna 'Franciscus' - confined to Europe
- Canna 'Gold Ader' - confined to USA
- Canna 'Inferno'
- Canna 'Tiger Stripe'
- Canna 'Tropicanna' - a registered trademark and used as a synonym widely throughout the world.

== See also ==
- Canna
- List of Canna species
- List of Canna cultivars
- List of Canna hybridists
