= Canna 'Madame Crozy' =

Plant cultivar

- Canna 'Madame Crozy'
- Genus: Canna
- Cultivar group: 'Crozy Group'
- Cultivar: 'Madame Crozy'
- Breeder: A. Crozy, Lyon, France in 1889

Canna 'Madame Crozy' is a medium-sized 'Crozy Group' canna cultivar; green foliage, large, ovoid shaped, branching habit; oval stems, coloured red; spikes of flowers are open, scarlet with a narrow gold margin, throat gold with vermilion spots, staminodes are medium size, edges regular, petals red, fully self-cleaning; fertile both ways, not true to type, self-pollinating; rhizomes are thick, up to 3 cm in diameter, coloured purple; tillering is prolific. It was introduced by A. Crozy, Lyon, France in 1890 and was named in honour of his wife. It was awarded the RHS Award of Garden Merit (AGM) in 1890.

It is hardy to USDA Zone 7 ( -15 °C) and can be grown in fertile and moist soils which are well drained.

== Synonyms ==
- Canna 'Mrs Cozy'
- Canna 'Mrs Croky',

== See also ==
- Canna
- List of Canna species
- List of Canna cultivars
- List of Canna hybridists
