= Canna 'Bengal Tiger' =

Flowering plant cultivar

Canna 'Bengal Tiger' is an Italian Group canna cultivar with variegated foliage; plant height 190 cm; foliage height 140 cm; upright stems and gently spreading leaves; ovoid foliage, background of green (137A); veins variegated yellow (mostly 13B), but paler in places (13D); maroon edge to leaf; staminodes, labellum and stamen bright orange (28B) blushed a darker, reddish (32A) in places; yellow (15A) on edges; stigma deep orange-red; petals strongly flushed red. The flower has a crumpled silk appearance; seed and pollen has very low fertility levels; rhizomes thick, up to 3 cm in diameter.

== Gallery ==
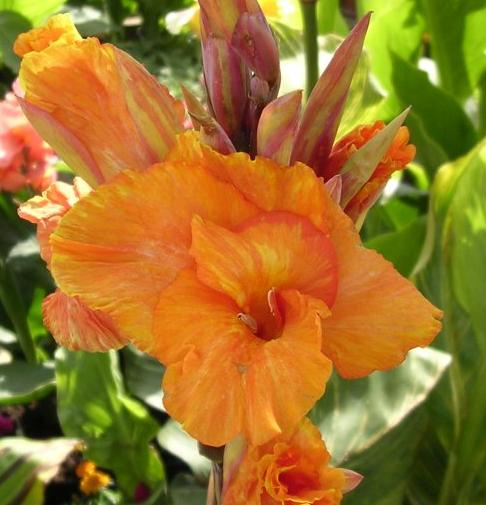

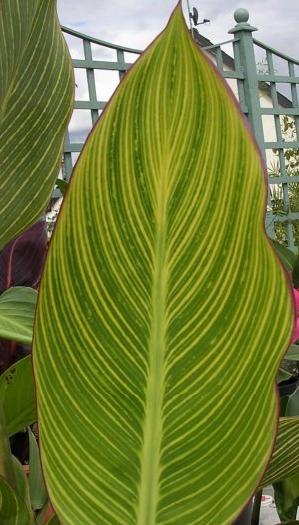

== History ==
Originated at the Agri Horticultural Society of India, Bengal in the 1960s. It was later transported to the African continent, by Sydney Percy-Lancaster, the Secretary of the Society, when he retired to Rhodesia; hence the synonym of C. 'Pretoria' when it was discovered by US plant collectors in South Africa in the late 1960s. Also imported to the United States from India in 1963 by Glasshouse Works.

In 2002, granted the 'Award of Garden Merit' (AGM) in the Canna outdoor trials held at RHS Wisley, under the synonym of Canna 'Striata'

== Synonyms ==
The following list of synonyms is not complete, as some new ones have been created recently.

- Canna 'African Yellow' - confined to Europe
- Canna 'americanallis var. variegata' - confined to USA
- Canna 'aureo-striata'
- Canna 'Damascus Road' - confined to Southern USA
- Canna 'Imperialis'
- Canna 'Kapit'
- Canna 'malawiensis variegata'
- Canna 'Pallida Variegata' - confined to Europe
- Canna 'Panach'
- Canna 'Panaché' - confined to France.
- Canna 'Pretoria'
- Canna 'Pretoria Dwarf'
- Canna 'Striata' - this name belongs to an early cultivar from 1868, still being grown in Europe.
- Canna 'Striatum'
- Canna 'Striped Wonder'
- Canna 'Tropicanna Gold'
- Canna 'Zebra Summer'
- Canna 'Zebra Sunset'

== See also ==
- Canna
- List of Canna species
- List of Canna cultivars
