= Canna 'Pringle Bay' =

Flowering plant cultivar

Canna 'Pringle Bay' is a miniature Italian and variegated group canna cultivar; variegated foliage, oval shaped, spreading habit; flowers are open, self-coloured pink, staminodes are large; fertile both ways, not true to type, not self-pollinating; rhizomes are thick, up to 3 cm in diameter, coloured pink and purple. Its main attraction is the bright variegated foliage, green, bronze and pink. Only about 40 cm in height.

Terence Bloch introduced it from South Africa and named it 'Pringle Bay', after where it originated from in that country. Somewhat mysteriously, the name 'Pink Sunburst' now seems to be the preferred name, but the International Code of Nomenclature for Cultivated Plants stipulates that this is simply a synonym of the original name.

== Synonyms ==
- Canna 'Pink Sunburst'
- Canna 'Technicolor'

== Gallery ==
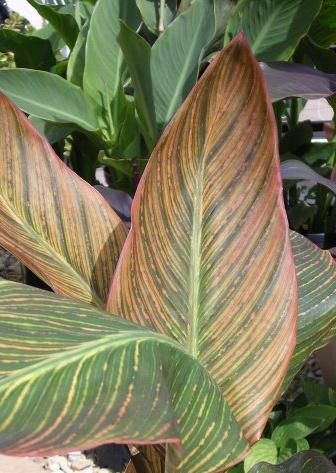

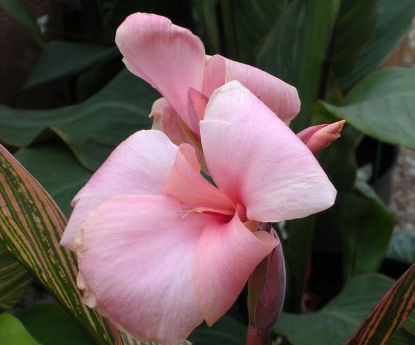

== See also ==
- Canna
- List of Canna cultivars
