= Canna 'Trinacria' =

Flowering plant cultivar

- Genus: Canna
- Hybrid parentage: Canna flaccida
- Cultivar group: Italian Group
- Breeder: C. Sprenger, Dammann & Co., Naples, Italy

Canna 'Trinacria' is a tall 'Italian Group' Canna cultivar; with light green foliage, large, oval shaped, branching habit; clusters of flowers are open, sulphur-yellow with faint red spots in the throat, staminodes are large, throat pearl base; labellum is sulphur-yellow, throat pearl; stamen is sulphur-yellow, style is sulphur-yellow, petals green, fully self-cleaning, good bloomer; seed is sterile, pollen is low fertile; rhizomes are long and thin, coloured white; tillering is prolific. Introduced by C. Sprenger, Dammann & Co., Naples, Italy, EU.

The flowers show their Canna flaccida heritage and fade very quickly, but while they are young they are an absolute delight.
