= Pierre Antoine Marie Crozy =

French rose breeder (1831–1903)

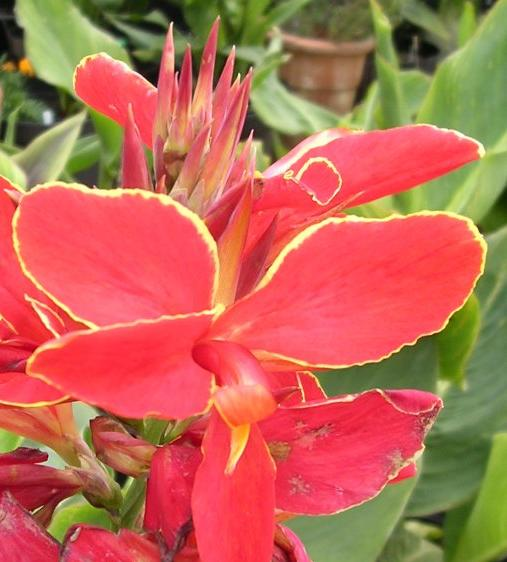
Canna (Crozy Group) 'Antonin Crozy'

Pierre Antoine Marie Crozy (1831–1903) [also called Crozy aîné—French for "elder"] was a nineteenth-century French rose breeder. He was a partner in the French firm, Avoux & Crozy, La Guillotière, Lyon, actively breeding roses from the 1850s to 1860s. From the early 1860s until his death in 1903 he was also hybridising Canna species, and introduced many hundreds of new cultivars. The largest Canna Group today is still called the Crozy Group, and many of those cultivars are still being raised.

The most famous of the cultivars introduced by Crozy was Canna 'Madame Crozy', and this was later used by both Carl Sprenger in Italy and Luther Burbank in California to cross with the species Canna flaccida to produce the first of the Italian Group Cannas.

Crozy was succeeded by his son, Michel Crozy (1871-1908).

== See also ==
- Canna (plant)
- List of Canna cultivars
- List of Canna species
- List of Canna hybridists
