= Wilhelm Pfitzer =

German horticulturist (1821–1905)

Wilhelm Pfitzer (21 January 1821 - 31 July 1905) was a German horticulturist.

Wilhelm II Pfitzer in 1844, founded a nursery on a property at Militärstraße, Stuttgart in Baden-Württemberg, Germany, where his father, Wilhelm I Pfitzer, owned a property for his private gardening interest. Wilhelm II founded a family firm that exists to this day and which has been a major influence on the development of many flower types, especially Dahlias, Gladioli, and Canna.

With his wife, Friederike, née Schickler (married 12 July 1849, died 27 December 1892), he extended the nursery around the vegetable and flower seed trades.

== Wilhelm III Pfitzer ==
His son, Wilhelm III Pfitzer (11 August 1854 - 4 April 1921), for a period of seven years, worked for the famous Louis Van Houtte nursery in Ghent, Belgium, and others in the Netherlands, France and northern Germany, acquiring a rich experience he was able to bring with him when he returned to the family business along with many specimens of exotic plants. He joined the business in 1876 and served an apprenticeship with his father. In 1880, he became the head of the firm.

Through reliability and industry, the business acquired loyal buyers and market traders for their products. A first seed and bulb catalogue was published, thus increasing business.

During the 1870s he acquired Canna material from Herr Ehmann, also a Stuttgart nurseryman and for whom the much-favoured Canna ‘Ehmanni’ is named. That was the start of the involvement of the house of Pfitzer with the Canna genus.

By 1880, the breeding of gladioli in pure colours succeeded for the first time. The new cultivars were introduced on World Fairs. In the long list of the prizes and honours the most notable were Dahlias (230), Gladioli (650), Canna (270), Petunien (400), Geraniums (630), Verbenen (850) and Phlox (500), appearing in Canada, USA, London, Paris, Brussels, Petersburg, Moscow, Hamburg, Dortmund, Bonn, and others.

In the 1890's the Wilhelm Pfitzer by Späth nursery in Germany introduced J. chinensis ‘Pfitzeriana’, a male clone that became one of the most widely plant conifers in the world. After investigations of Peter van Melle, a New York plantsman it has been established J. chinensis ‘Pfitzeriana’ was of hybrid origin, i.e., J. chinensis × J. sabina. The hybrid was given the name Juniperus × pfitzeriana and the male clone was designated Juniperus × pfitzeriana ‘Wilhelm Pfitzer’ with epithet honors of Wilhelm Pfitzer.

== Property at Fellbach ==
In 1909, the original property was sold for building as the city expanded and the company looked for new land outside Stuttgart. In 1910, they acquired 5 acres (20,000 m^{2}) of rural land near the railway station at Fellbach, about six miles (10 km) outside Stuttgart. Offices, warehouse, greenhouse, and nursery beds rapidly emerged.

The land at Fellbach proved to be suitable for the cultivation of tender garden varieties and the business prospered. Above all other lines, the Gladiolus business grew to be larger than the Dahlias, Roses, Phlox, Delphiniums, Begonias, Cannas, and flowering shrubs. The company grew all of these lines and bred new cultivars ceaselessly.

== World War One ==
The First World War proven a major setback as valuable breeding material could no longer be obtained. Most of the workforce were conscripted, but later replaced by prisoners of war. During the inflation years in Germany, 1923-1924 the firm was able to retain its entire workforce, due to their prudent management practices.

== Inter-war years ==
After the death of Wilhelm III Pfitzer in 1921, his sons Paul (27. 10. 1883), Wilhelm IV (11.5.1896) and Rudolf Pfitzer (11.6.1897) took on the responsibility to construct the new nursery, supported by their mother Anna née Koch (married 11 July 1878, died 14 January 1937). When financial order was restored in Germany, the firm re-organised and opened new outlets in Göppingen, Ulm, and Heilbronn, selling not only seed and plants but also the latest horticultural equipment, fertilisers and fungicides. A department for bird and dog lines was added at the same time. The seed and bulb business was promoted through a coloured catalogue with images of their new cultivars.

Wilhelm IV Pfitzer was still in demand judging at international fairs, exhibitions, and shows, retaining his Presidency and Vice Presidency of the German and British Gladiolus Societies respectively, right until the end. His continual interest in Cannas meant a steady supply of new cultivars being produced each year.

In 1933, there were about 150 employees worldwide. That same year, in order to laud the elevation of Fellbach to the status of a city, the firm named one of its best seedlings that year as Canna ‘Stadt Fellbach’, meaning ‘City of Fellbach’. That is still a popular cultivar in this day and age.

=== Pfitzer's Flower Show ===
Up to the Second World War thousands of visitors from all around the world descended annually on Fellbach to visit Pfitzer’s Flower Show. In addition, a multitude of young apprentices and sons of others in the trade enjoyed training at Fellbach, at what was recognised as one of the leading places of horticultural education in the world at that time.

Gladiolus were still the most important and largest department of the firm, but Canna still provided a steady supply of business as they continued to hybridise new cultivars.

== World War two ==
During World War II, most employees were conscripted and the nursery business had to be restricted and relocated. Vegetable type crops were ordered to be grown, regardless of the loss of valuable flowering stock. Head gardeners, too old for military service, had to contend with prisoners of war being billeted at Fellbach, and taught to grow vegetables. This was not onerous for the prisoners as it ensured that they ate much better than other prisoners of war did.

The attempts at saving flowering stock that was carried out directly against the law only met with limited success, and much stock was lost during that time. Much will never be recovered. Sadly, many “Pfitzeraners” never returned and much knowledge and experience was lost. Some of the world's leading hybridisers had been working at Fellbach before hostilities.

== Post World Wars ==
After the war, the company was never able to regain its market share. Hostility to German goods existed for a while in both Europe and the USA, but more important, the neighbouring countries with favourable climates started to predominate. With their more favourable climate, they could produce in one year a harvest, or many harvests, that would take 2–3 years in Fellbach. In addition, the wage costs were more favourable to Mediterranean competitors.

The firm had to retrench, and wound-up leases on much of its land and reduced its work force. It focussed on just Dahlias, Gladiolus, and Canna. In order to publicise its products to potential customers, many of whom had never heard of the companies’ world-leading reputation, they involved themselves in numberless local and foreign gardening shows, fairs and exhibitions, competing successfully and with distinction. However, by the mid-1980s the firm had diminished in size to just six employees and 2 acres (8,100 m^{2}) of garden beds.
