= Canna Agriculture Group =

The Canna Agriculture Group contains all of the varieties of Canna used in agriculture. Canna achira and Canna edulis (Latin: eatable) are generic terms used in South America to describe the cannas that have been selectively bred for agricultural purposes, normally derived from C. discolor. It is grown especially for its edible rootstock from which starch is obtained, but the leaves and young seed are also edible, and achira was once a staple food crop in Peru and Ecuador.

== Farming varieties ==
There are some named agricultural varieties, and published comparative studies have involved:

- C. 'Brick Canna'
- C. 'Chinese Purple'
- C. 'Edulis Dark'
- C. 'Edulis Green'
- C. 'Japanese Green'
- C. 'Korean yellow flower'
- C. 'Korean Green Stem'
- C. 'Korean Red Stem'
- C. 'Queensland Arrowroot'
- C. 'Thai-purple'
- C. 'Thai-green'
- C. 'Tous les Mois'

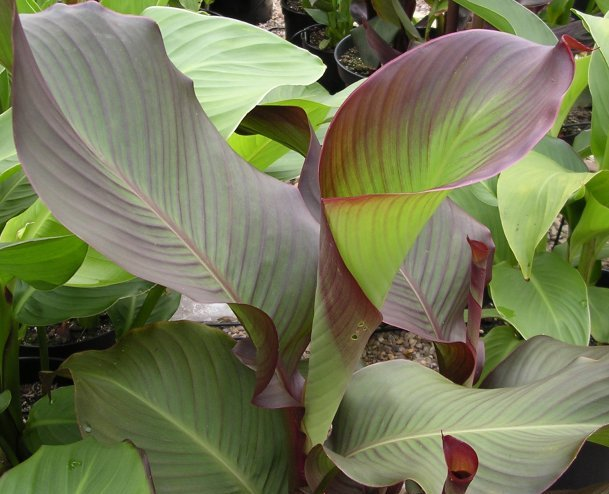
Canna (Agriculture Group) 'Edulis Dark'

Many more traditional varieties exist worldwide, they have all involved human selection and so are classified as agricultural cultivars. Folk lore states that Canna edulis Ker-Gawl. is the variety grown for food in South America, but there is no scientific evidence to substantiate the name as a separate species. It is probable that this is simply a synonym of C. discolor, which is grown for agricultural purposes throughout South America and Asia.

In the Andes, the rhizome can be harvested within 6 months from planting out and the yield ranges 13–85 tonnes per hectare, with 22–50 tonnes being average, though larger yields are obtained after 8–10 months. In Queensland, Australia, they are able to obtain a yield of 5–10 tons of C. 'Queensland Arrowroot' tubers per acre.

Most cultivated forms do not produce fertile seed. There are also sterile triploid forms, these contain a significantly higher proportion of starch, though their cropping potential is not known.

== Animal fodder ==
The rhizomes and leaves are good fodder for cattle and pigs and it is grown for this purpose in Tropical Africa and Hawaii, where it is harvested 4–8 months after planting. The foliage of Agricultural Canna is also used for its silage making properties, which are superior to those of corn.

== Human consumption ==
Canna is still grown for human consumption in the Andes and also in Vietnam and southern China, where the starch is used to make cellophane noodles.

=== Edible qualities ===
Rootstock – actually a rhizome, this can be eaten either raw or cooked. It is the source of canna starch which is used as a substitute for arrowroot. The starch is obtained by rasping the rhizome to a pulp, then washing and straining to get rid of the fibres. This starch is very digestible. The very young rhizomes can also be eaten cooked, they are sweet but fibrous. The rhizome can be very large, sometimes as long as a person's forearm. In Peru the rhizomes are baked for up to 12 hours by which time they become a white, translucent, fibrous and somewhat mucilaginous mass with a sweetish taste. The starch is in very large grains, about three times the size of potato starch grains, and can be seen with the naked eye. This starch is easily separated from the fibre of the rhizome.

Young shoots – these can be cooked and eaten as a green vegetable and are quite nutritious, containing at least 10% protein.

== See also ==
- Canna
- List of Canna species
- List of Canna cultivars
- List of Canna hybridists
- Canna leaf roller
- Canna virus
- Canna rust
- Japanese beetle
