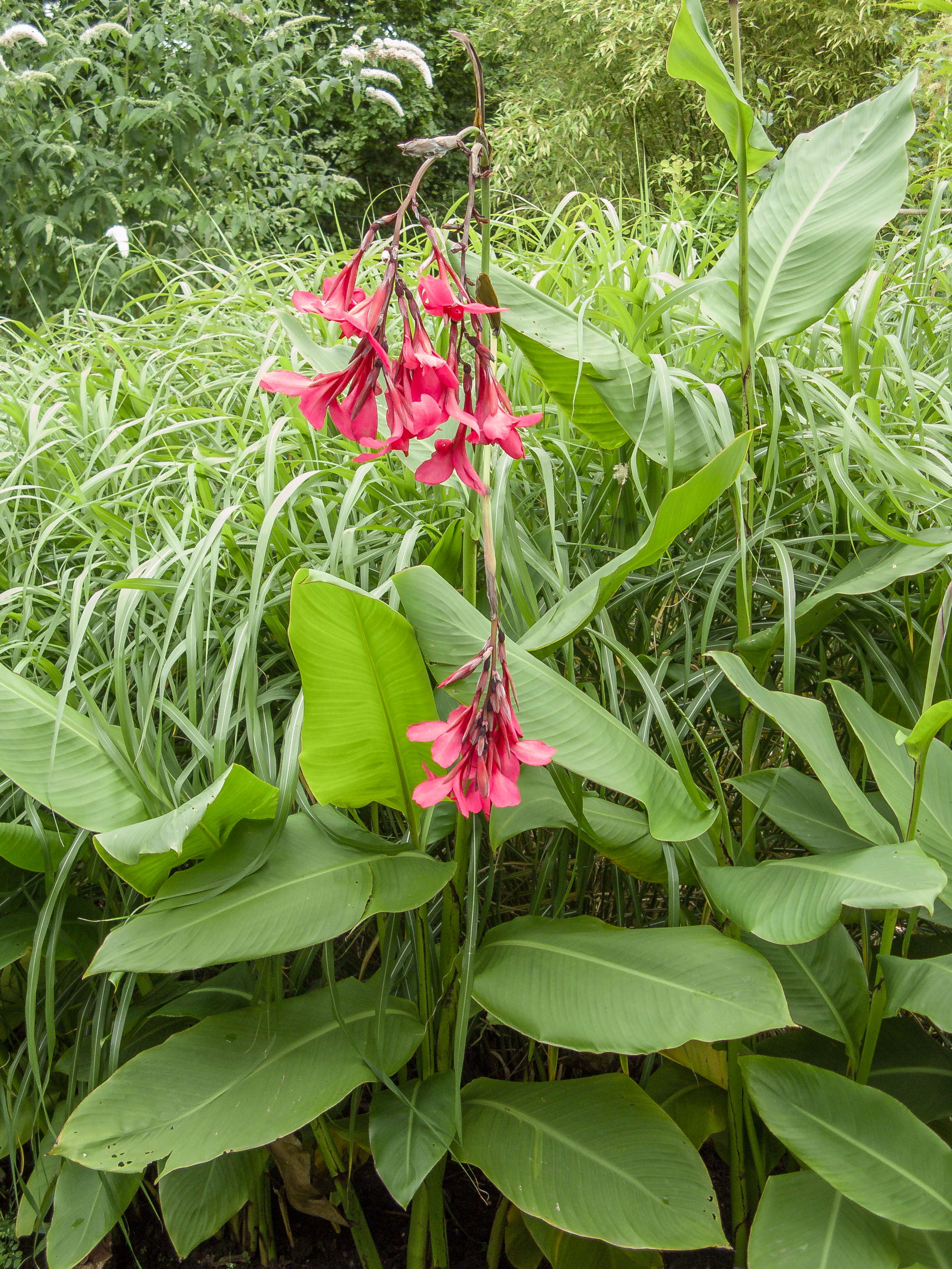

Scientific classification
- Kingdom: Plantae
- Clade: Tracheophytes
- Clade: Angiosperms
- Clade: Monocots
- Clade: Commelinids
- Order: Zingiberales
- Family: Cannaceae
- Genus: Canna
- Species: C. × ehemannii

Binomial name
- Canna × ehemannii Gower

= Canna × ehemannii =

Species of flowering plant

Canna × ehemannii is an early cultivar of canna, believed to be a hybrid between Canna indica and Canna iridiflora. Its name is sometimes spelt Canna × ehemanii, although it has the English name Ehemann's canna. It has gained the Royal Horticultural Society's Award of Garden Merit.

The name is of doubtful standing, being treated as a "nomen subnudum" by, for example, the World Checklist of Selected Plant Families, meaning that it was published without an adequate description.

It has large leaves, and tall, arching stems, carrying drooping flowers of a reddish-purple colour from early summer onwards. It has been described as looking somewhat like a cross between a banana and a fuchsia.

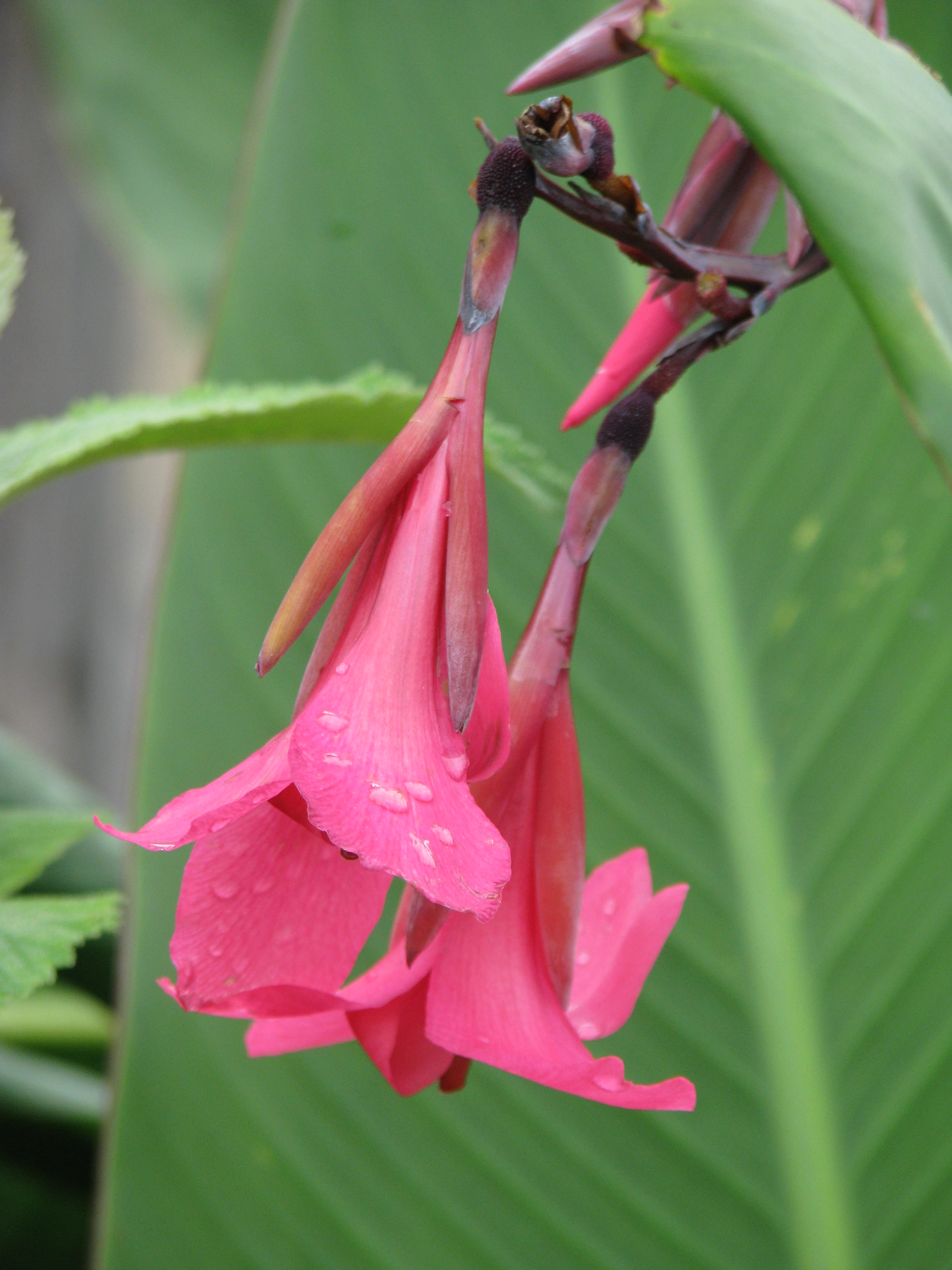
Flowers
