= C. densifolia =

C. densifolia may refer to:

- Calceolaria densifolia, a lady's purse
- Calyptranthes densifolia, a flowering plant
- Canna densifolia, a garden plant
- Caraipa densifolia, a flowering plant
- Chimonobambusa densifolia, an evergreen plant
