= C. lambertii =

C. lambertii may refer to:

- Callophyllis lambertii, a red algae
- Canna lambertii, a garden plant
- Connarus lambertii, a woody plant
- Cotoneaster lambertii, a plant with dimorphic shoots
