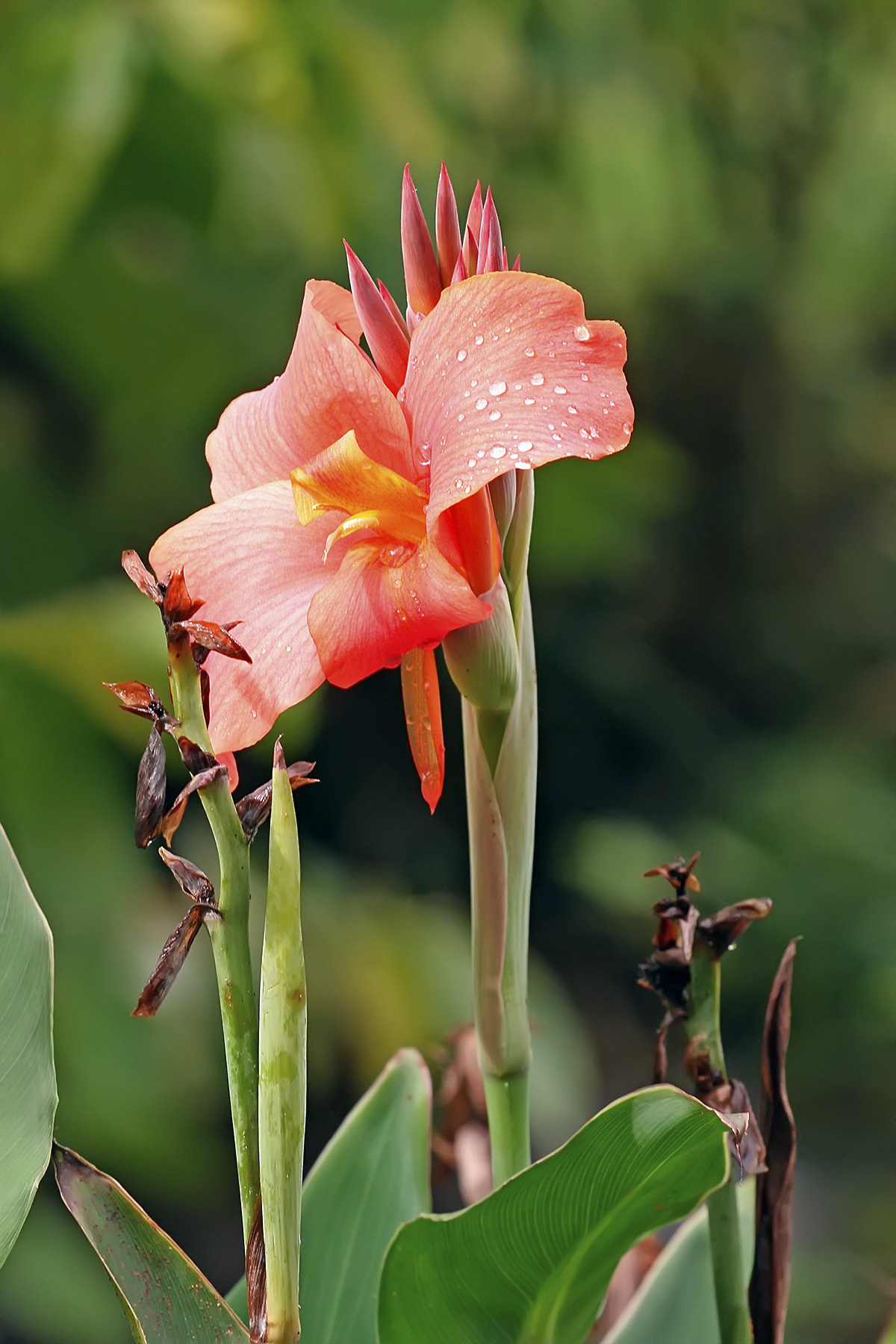
- Canna hybrid flowers and foliage

Scientific classification
- Kingdom: Plantae
- Clade: Tracheophytes
- Clade: Angiosperms
- Clade: Monocots
- Clade: Commelinids
- Order: Zingiberales
- Family: Cannaceae; Juss.
- Genus: Canna; L.

Species
- 19 classified species, see List of Canna species

Synonyms
- Cannacorus Mill.; Katubala Adans.; Xyphostylis Raf.; Achirida Horan; Distemon Bouché; Eurystylus Bouché

= Canna (plant) =

Genus of flowering plants

Canna is a genus of flowering plants consisting of 10 species known as cannas or canna lilies. It is the only genus in the family Cannaceae. All of the genus's species are native to the American tropics and were naturalized in Europe, India and Africa in the 1860s. Although they grow native to the tropics, most cultivars have been developed in temperate climates and are easy to grow in most countries of the world, as long as they receive at least 6–8 hours average sunlight during the summer, and are moved to a warm location for the winter. See the Canna cultivar gallery for photographs of Canna cultivars.

Cannas are not true lilies, but have been assigned by the APG II system of 2003 to the order Zingiberales in the monocot clade Commelinids, together with their closest relatives, the gingers, spiral gingers, bananas, arrowroots, heliconias, and birds of paradise.

The plants have large foliage, so horticulturists have developed selected forms as large-flowered garden plants. Cannas are also used in agriculture as a source of starch for human and animal consumption. C. indica and C. glauca have been grown into many cultivars in India and Africa.

== Description ==
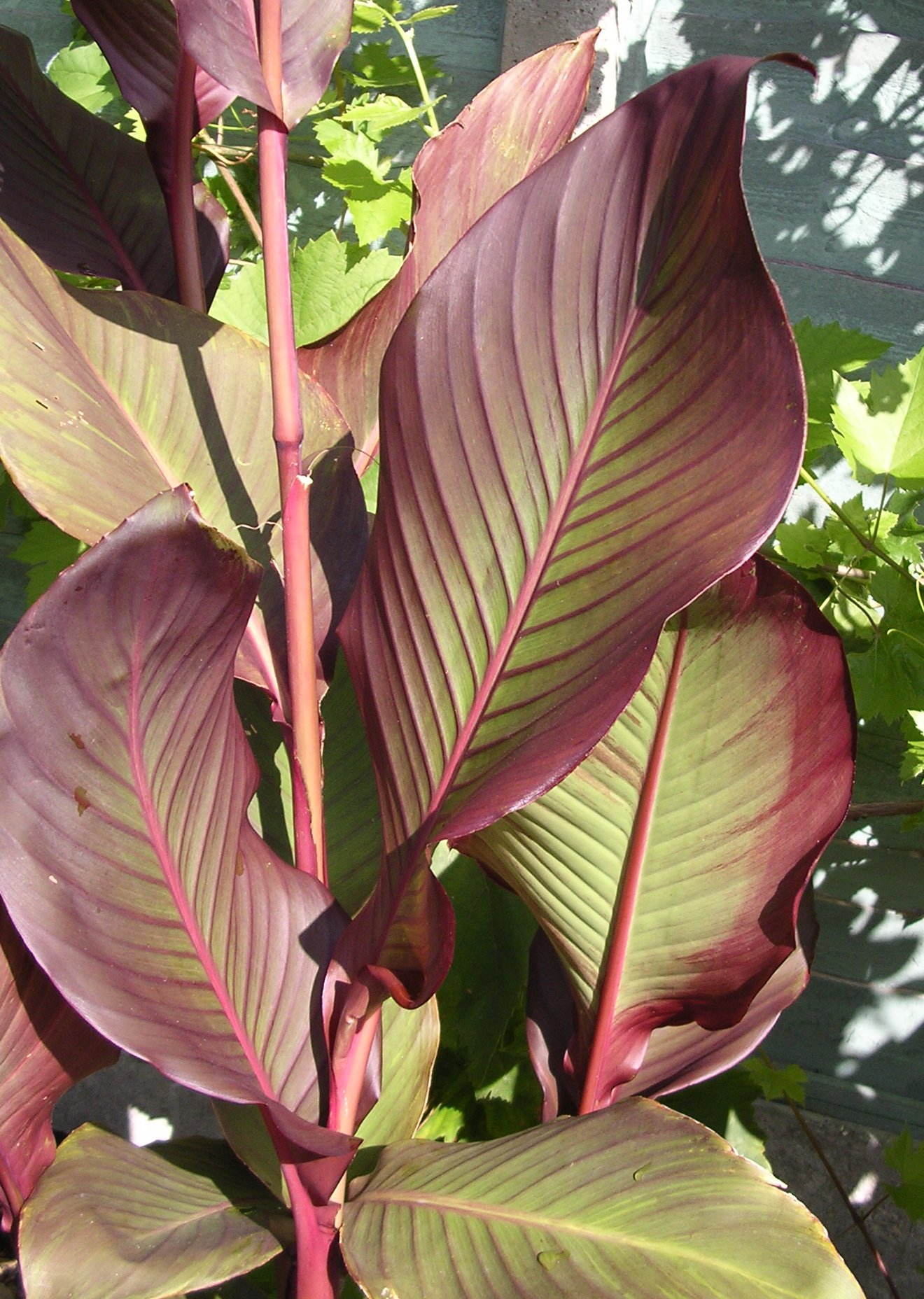
Canna (foliage group) 'Auguste Ferrier'

The plants are large tropical and subtropical herbaceous perennials with a rhizomatous rootstock. The broad, flat, alternate leaves that are such a feature of these plants, grow out of a stem in a long, narrow roll and then unfurl. The leaves are typically solid green, but some cultivars have glaucose, brownish, maroon, or even variegated leaves.

The flowers are asymmetric and composed of three sepals and three petals that are small, inconspicuous, and hidden under extravagant stamens. What appear to be petals are the highly modified stamens or staminodes. The staminodes number (1–) 3 (–4) (with at least one staminodal member called the labellum, always being present. A specialized staminode, the stamen, bears pollen from a half-anther. A somewhat narrower "petal" is the pistil, which is connected down to a three-chambered ovary.

The flowers are typically red, orange, or yellow, or any combination of those colours, and are aggregated in inflorescences that are spikes or panicles (thyrses). The main pollinators of the flowers are bees, hummingbirds, sunbirds, and bats. The pollination mechanism is conspicuously specialized. Pollen is shed on the style while still in the bud, and in the species and early hybrids, some is also found on the stigma because of the high position of the anther, which means that they are self-pollinating. Later cultivars have a lower anther, and rely on pollinators alighting on the labellum and touching first the terminal stigma, and then the pollen.

The wild species often grow to at least 2–3 m (6.6–9.8 ft) in height, but wide variation in size exists among cultivated plants; numerous cultivars have been selected for smaller stature.

Cannas grow from swollen underground stems, correctly known as rhizomes, which store starch, and this is the main attraction of the plant to agriculture, having the largest starch grains of all plant life.

Canna is the only member of the monocot group in which hibernation of seed is known to occur, due to its hard, impenetrable seed covering.

== Taxonomy ==
=== History ===
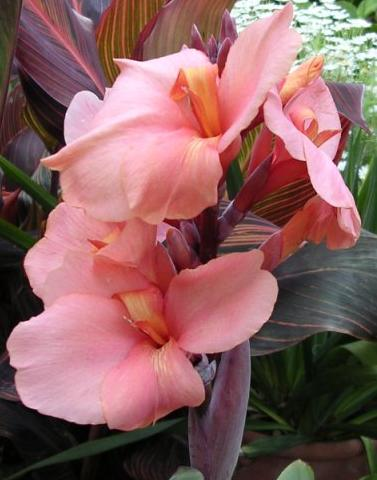
Canna (Crozy Group) 'Alberich', Pfitzer 1949

The name Canna originates from the Latin word for a cane or reed.

Canna indica, commonly called achira in Latin America, has been cultivated by Native Americans in tropical America for thousands of years, and was one of the earliest domesticated plants in the Americas. The starchy root is edible.

The first species of Canna introduced to Europe was C. indica, which was imported from the East Indies, though the species originated from the Americas. Charles de l'Ecluse, who first described and sketched C. indica, indicated this origin, and stated that it was given the name indica, not because the plant is from India, in Asia, but because this species was originally transported from America: Quia ex America primum delata sit; and at that time, one described the tropical areas of that part of the globe as the West Indies.

Much later, in 1658, Willem Piso made reference to another species that he documented under the vulgar or common name of 'Albara' and 'Pacivira', which resided, he said, in the "shaded and damp places, between the tropics"; this species is C. angustifolia L. (later reclassified as C. glauca L. by taxonomists).

=== Phylogeny ===
Cladogram: Phylogeny of Zingiberales

- Zingiberales
  - - - Zingiberineae
        - Zingiberariae
          - Zingiberaceae
          - Costaceae
        - Cannariae
          - Cannaceae
          - Marantaceae
      - - Strelitziineae
          - Lowiaceae
          - Strelitziaceae
        - Heliconiaceae
  - - Musaceae

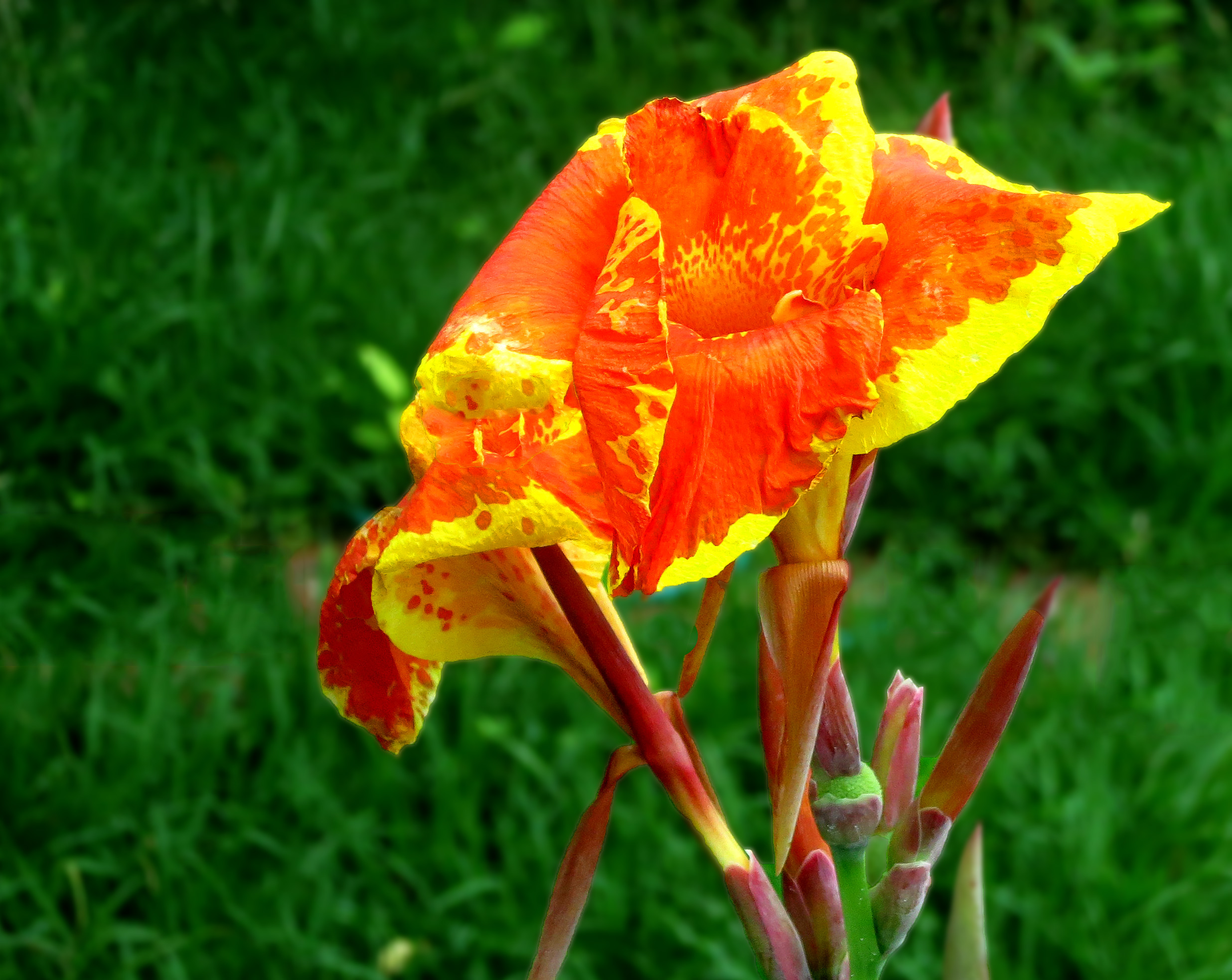
Texas Gulf Coast, Red & Yellow

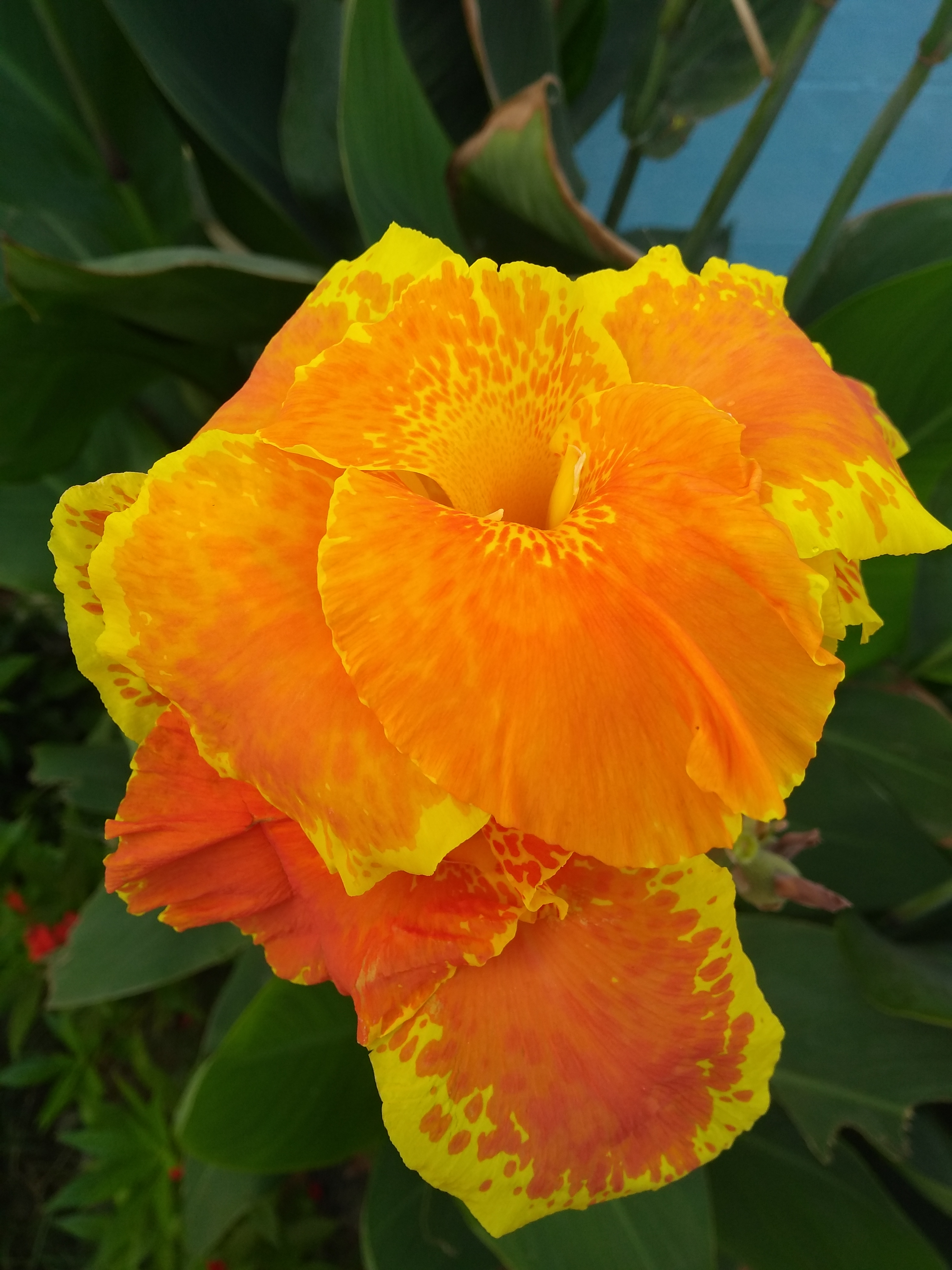
Orange canna lily

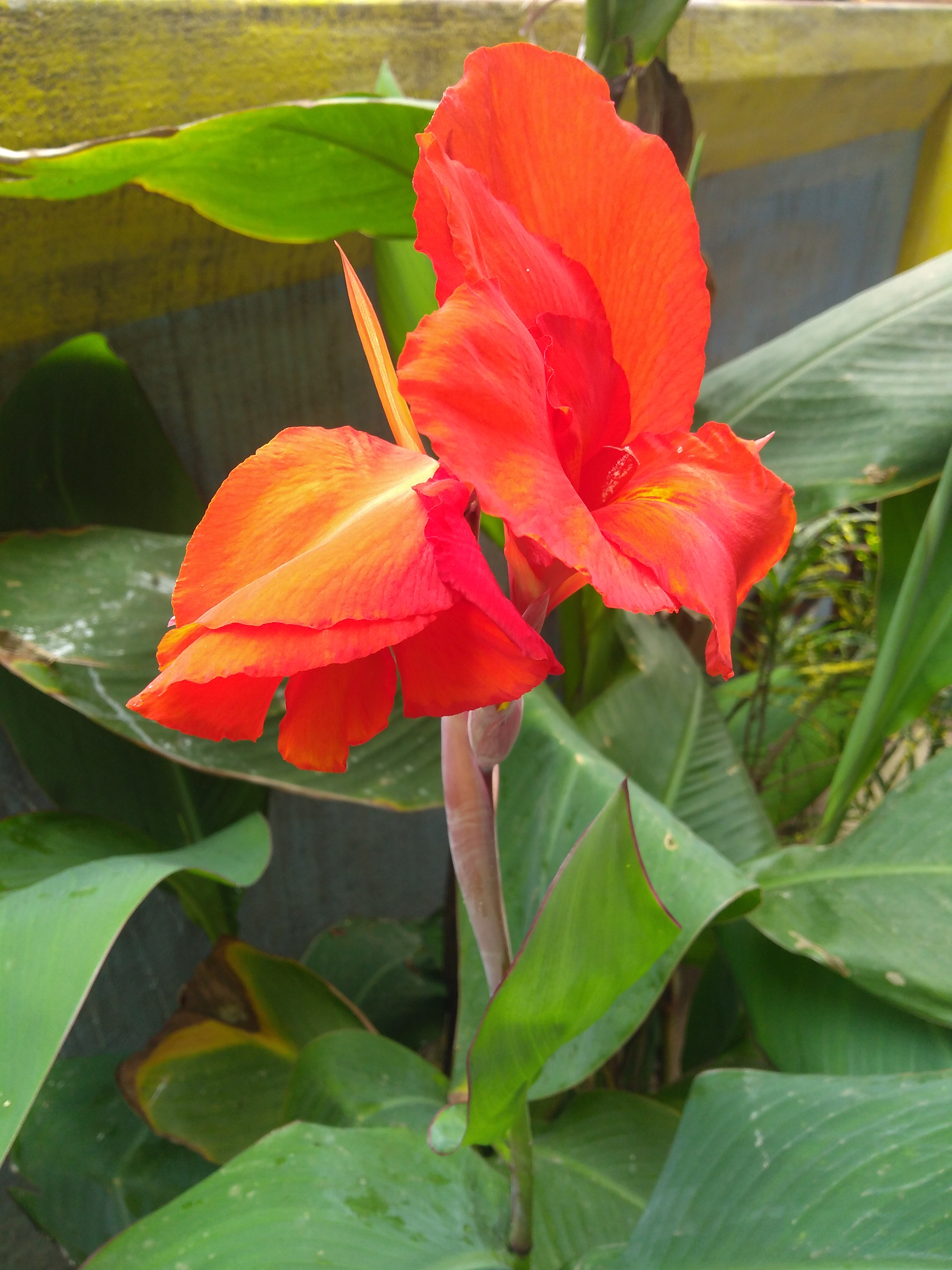
Red canna lily

=== Species ===
Although most cannas grown these days are cultivars (see below), about 20 known species are of the wild form, and in the last three decades of the 20th century, Canna species have been categorized by two different taxonomists, Paul Maas, from the Netherlands and Nobuyuki Tanaka from Japan. Both reduced the number of species from the 50–100 accepted previously, assigning most as synonyms.

This reduction in species is also confirmed by work done by Kress and Prince at the Smithsonian Institution, but this only covers a subset of the species range.

== Distribution ==
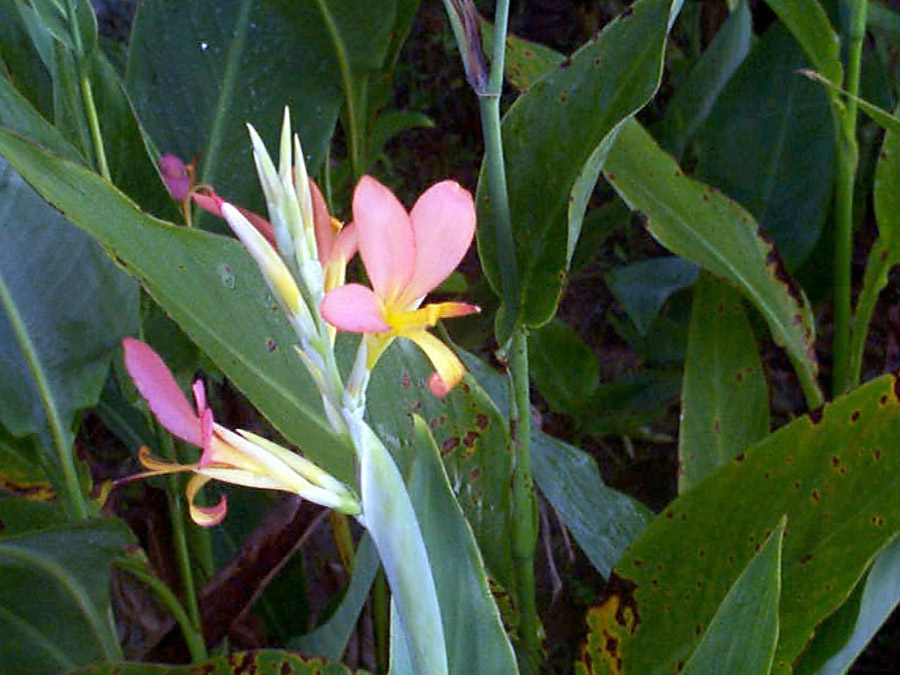
Canna 'Pink Dancer' in Escambray Mountains, Cuba

The genus is native to tropical and subtropical regions of the New World, from the Southern United States (southern South Carolina west to southern Texas) and south to northern Argentina.

C. indica has become naturalized in many tropical areas around the world, is a difficult plant to remove, and is invasive in some places.

Canna cultivars are grown in most countries, even those with territory above the Arctic Circle, which have short summers, but long days, and the rapid growth rate of cannas makes them a feasible gardening plant, as long as they receive 6–8 hours of sunlight each day during the growing season and are protected from the cold of winter.

== Ecology ==
=== Pests ===
Cannas are largely free of pests. However, in the eastern and southern United States, plants sometimes fall victim to the canna leaf roller moth, with the resultant leaf damage, while not being fatal to the plant, can be most distressing to a keen gardener's eye.

Slugs and snails are quite fond of cannas and their large, juicy leaves, potentially leaving unsightly holes where they have chewed on the plant—particularly during and after rainy periods (when mollusks become active). Slugs and snails tend to prefer tender, younger foliage, however. Red spider mites may also be a potential pest for cannas grown indoors, in dry areas, or that receive poor airflow.

For canna grown outside (in California or Texas, for example), mealybugs and scale insects are most drawn to the dense folds and creases between the leaves and the stem/petiole, where the foliage attaches to the plant. At times, if left unchecked, these sucking-insects may remain effectively concealed in these tight areas, only for older or dead leaves to be peeled off to reveal a small colony of white, fuzzy mealybugs congregated. Mealybugs are particularly prevalent in drier climates, such as the Southwestern US. Japanese beetles can also ravage the leaves if left uncontrolled.

These pests, while certainly able to drain a plant of its energy over time, and cause its eventual decline, are generally not lethal to the plant when dealt with immediately. The majority of insect pests on canna plants can be sprayed with a 70% isopropyl alcohol mist—diluted slightly—applied during non-sunny periods, as the alcohol may cause sunburn on the plant. Other effective options include insecticidal soap, neem and horticultural oils, and other commercially available spray treatments. Granulated systemic insecticides are also useful, and generally completely safe; when applied to the soil topically every few months, granulated or powdered systemics will prevent nearly all pest infestations (for the duration of effectiveness). Non-scented baby wipes or paper towels, moistened with rubbing alcohol or cider vinegar may be used to wipe any invisible eggs or larvae from the leaves.

=== Disease ===
Cannas are remarkably free of diseases, compared to many genera. However, they may fall victim to canna rust, a fungal disease resulting in orange spots on the plant's leaves, caused by over-moist soil. They are also susceptible to certain plant viruses, some of which are Canna-specific, which may result in spotted or streaked leaves, in a mild form, but can finally result in stunted growth and twisted and distorted blooms and foliage.

The flowers are sometimes affected by a grey, fuzzy mold called botrytis. Under humid conditions, it is often found growing on the older flowers. Treatment is to simply remove the old flowers, so the mold does not spread to the new flowers.

== Cultivation ==
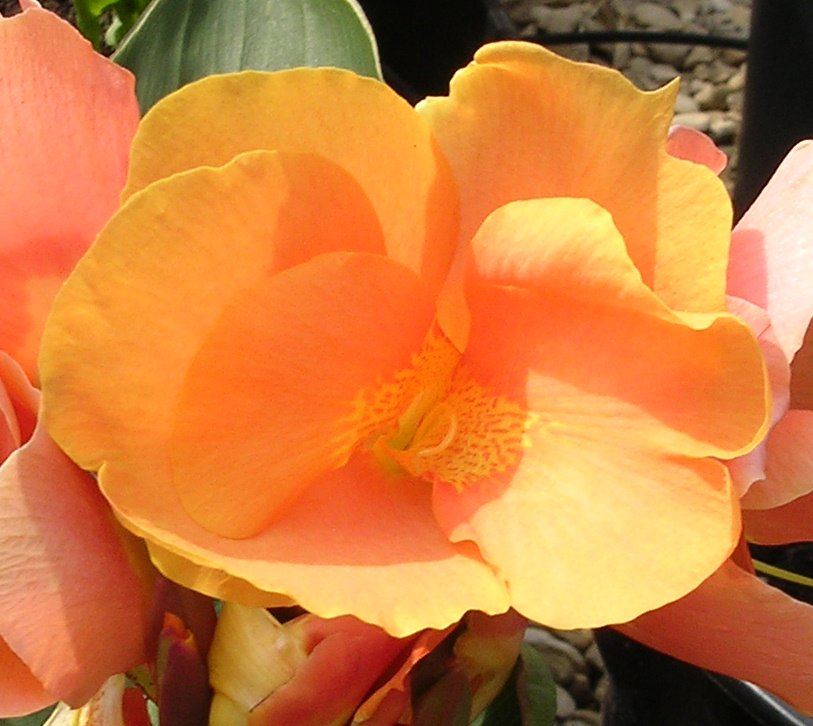
Canna (miniature group) 'Oberon'

Cannas grow best in full sun with moderate water in well-drained, rich or sandy soil. They grow from perennial rhizomes, but are frequently grown as annuals in temperate zones for an exotic or tropical look in the garden. In arid regions, cannas are often grown in the water garden, with the lower inch of pot submerged. In all areas, high winds tear the leaves, so shelter is advised.

The rhizomes are sensitive to frost and will rot if left unprotected in freezing conditions. In areas with winter temperatures below −10 °C (14 °F) in the winter (< USDA Zone 8b), the rhizomes can be dug up before freezing and stored (above 7 °C or 45 °F) for replanting in the spring. Otherwise, they should be protected by a thick layer of mulch over winter.

== Uses ==
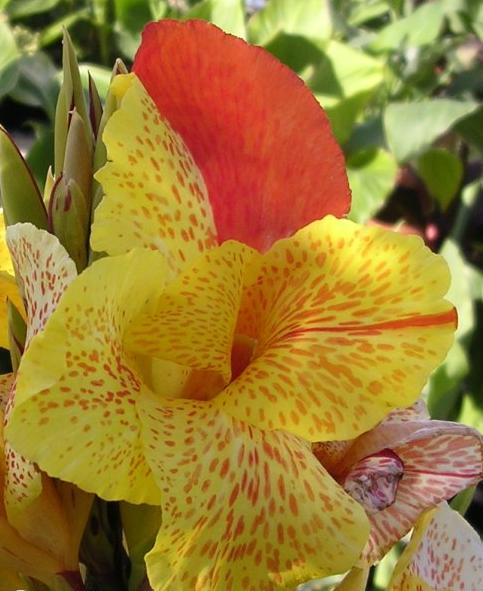
Canna (Italian group) 'Yellow King Humbert'

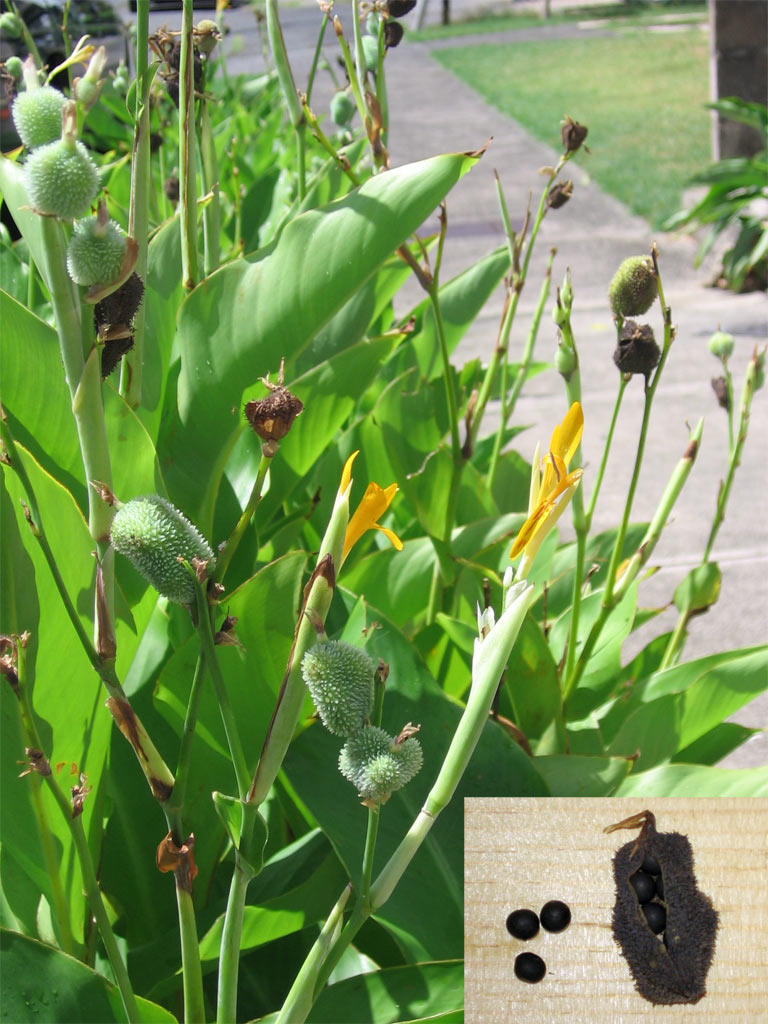
Detail of the seed pods and seeds: The seeds are used for jewelry and musical instruments.

- Some species and many cultivars are widely grown in the garden in temperate and subtropical regions. Sometimes, they are also grown as potted plants. A large number of ornamental cultivars have been developed. They can be used in herbaceous borders, tropical plantings, and as a patio or decking plant.
- Internationally, cannas are one of the most popular garden plants, and a large horticultural industry depends on the plant.
- The rhizomes of cannas are rich in starch, and have many uses in agriculture. All of the plant material has commercial value, rhizomes for starch (consumption by humans and livestock), stems and foliage for animal fodder, young shoots as a vegetable, and young seeds as an addition to tortillas.
- The seeds are used as beads in jewelry.
- The seeds are used as the mobile elements of the kayamb, a musical instrument from Réunion, as well as the hosho, a gourd rattle from Zimbabwe, where the seeds are known as hota seeds.
- In more remote regions of India, cannas are fermented to produce alcohol.
- The plant yields a fibre from the stem, which is used as a jute substitute.
- A fibre obtained from the leaves is used for making paper. The leaves are harvested in late summer after the plant has flowered, they are scraped to remove the outer skin, and are then soaked in water for two hours prior to cooking. The fibres are cooked for 24 hours with lye and then beaten in a blender. They make a light tan to brown paper.
- A purple dye is obtained from the seed.
- Smoke from the burning leaves is said to be insecticidal.
- Cannas are used to extract many undesirable pollutants in a wetland environment as they have a high tolerance to contaminants.
- In Thailand, cannas are a traditional gift for Father's Day.
- In Vietnam, canna starch is used to make cellophane noodles known as miến dong.
- Cannas attract hummingbirds, so can be part of a pollinator and wildlife habitat strategy.

=== Horticultural varieties (cultivars) ===
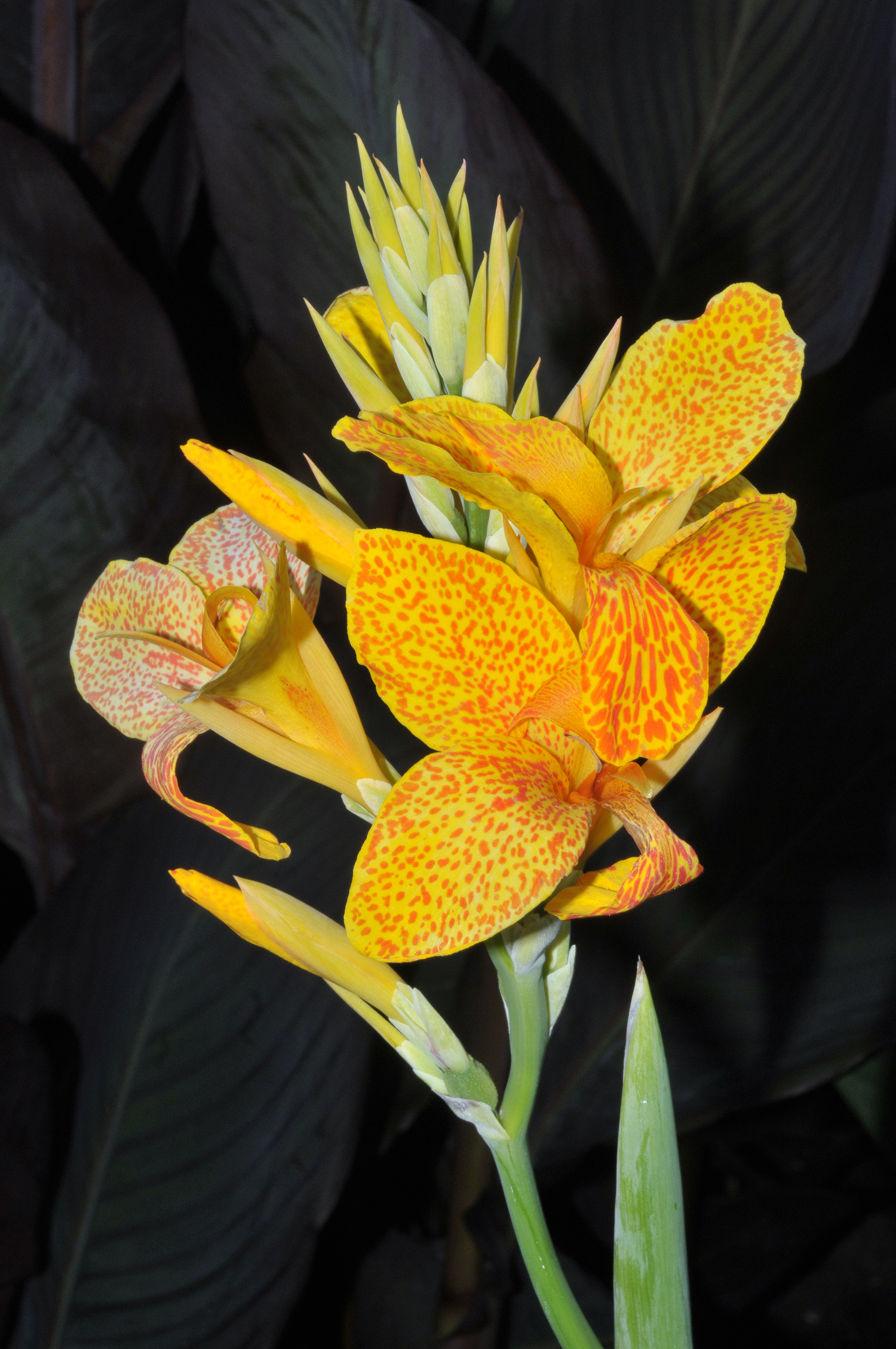
Canna 'Golden Gate'

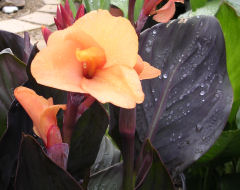
Canna (Crozy group) 'Theresa Blakey'

Cannas became very popular in Victorian times as garden plants, and were grown widely in France, Germany, Hungary, India, Italy, the United Kingdom, and the United States. Some cultivars from this time, including a sterile hybrid, usually referred to as Canna × ehemannii, are still commercially available. C. × ehemannii is tall and green-leafed with terminal drooping panicles of hot pink iris-like flowers, looking somewhat like a cross between a banana and a fuchsia.

As tender perennials in northern climates, they suffered severe setbacks when two world wars sent the young gardening staff off to war. The genus Canna has recently experienced a renewed interest and revival in popularity. Once, hundreds of cultivars existed, but many are now extinct. In 1910, Árpäd Mühle, from Hungary, published his Canna book, written in German. It contained descriptions of over 500 cultivars.

In recent years, many new cultivars have been created, but the genus suffers severely from having many synonyms for many popular ones. Most of the synonyms were created by old varieties resurfacing without viable names, with the increase in popularity from the 1960s onwards. Research has accumulated over 2,800 Canna cultivar names, but many of these are simply synonyms. See List of Canna hybridists for details of the people and firms that created the current Canna legacy.

In the early 20th century, Professor Liberty Hyde Bailey defined, in detail, two "garden species" (C. × generalis and C. × orchiodes) to categorise the floriferous cannas being grown at that time, namely the Crozy hybrids and the orchid-like hybrids introduced by Carl Ludwig Sprenger in Italy and Luther Burbank in the U.S., at about the same time (1894). The definition was based on the genotype, rather than the phenotype, of the two cultivar groups. Inevitably over time, those two floriferous groups were interbred, the distinctions became blurred and overlapped, and the Bailey species names became redundant. Pseudo-species names are now deprecated by the International Code of Nomenclature for Cultivated Plants which, instead, provides cultivar groups for categorising cultivars (see groups at List of Canna cultivars).

=== AGM cultivars ===
These canna cultivars have gained the Royal Horticultural Society's Award of Garden Merit:

- 'Alaska' (cream flushed yellow)
- 'Annaeei' (large blue-green leaves)
- C. × ehemannii (deep pink)
- 'Erebus' (coral pink)
- 'General Eisenhower' (bronze leaves, orange flowers)
- 'Louis Cayeux' (salmon pink)
- 'Musifolia' (large leaves flushed bronze)
- 'Mystique' (bronze leaves)
- 'Phasion' (bronze leaves, orange flowers)
- 'Picasso' (yellow spotted red flowers)
- 'Russian Red' (bronze leaves)
- 'Shenandoah' (flesh pink)
- 'Verdi' (bright orange)
- 'Whithelm Pride' (bright pink)
- 'Wyoming' (bright orange)

=== Agricultural varieties ===
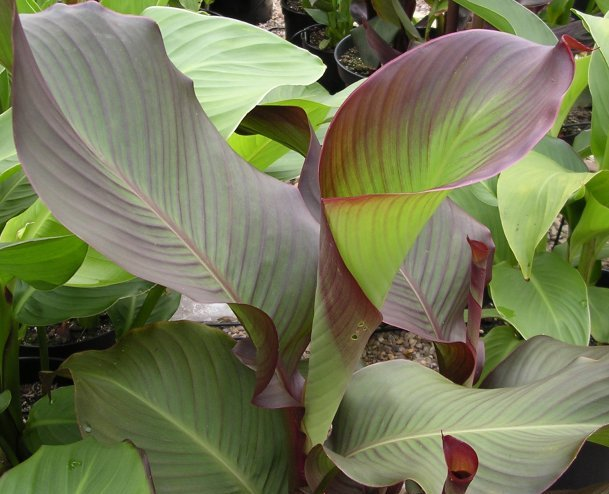
Canna (Agriculture Group) 'Edulis Dark'

The Canna Agriculture Group contains all of the varieties of Canna grown in agriculture. "Canna achira" is a generic term used in South America to describe the cannas that have been selectively bred for agricultural purposes, normally derived from C. discolor. It is grown especially for its edible rootstock from which starch is obtained, but the leaves and young seeds are also edible, and achira was once a staple food crop in Peru and Ecuador. Trials in Ecuador using a wide range of varieties have shown that achira can yield on average 56 tons of rhizomes and 7.8 tons of extractable starch per hectare. However, the crop needs 9–12 months to mature to full productivity.

Many more traditional kinds exist worldwide; they have all involved human selection, so are classified as agricultural cultivars. Traditionally, Canna edulis Ker Gawl. has been reputed to be the species grown for food in South America, but C. edulis probably is simply a synonym of C. discolor, which is also grown for agricultural purposes throughout Asia.

=== Propagation ===
==== Sexual propagation ====
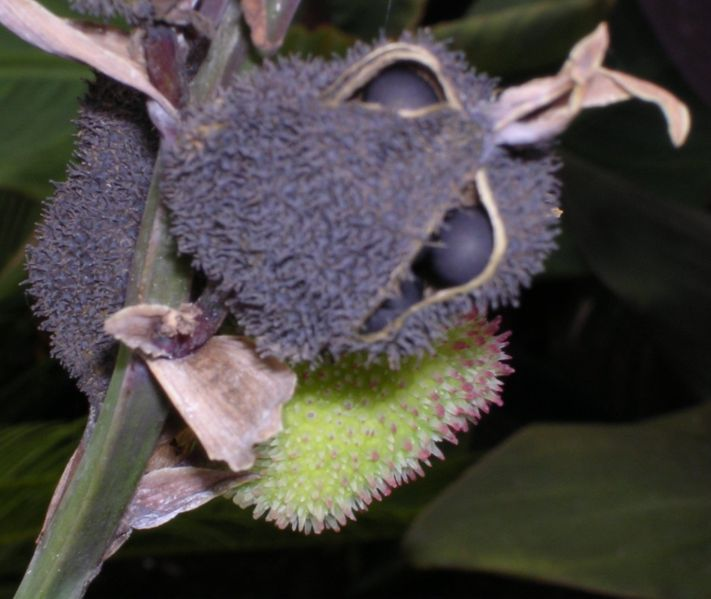
Canna fruit (green) and ripe seed pods

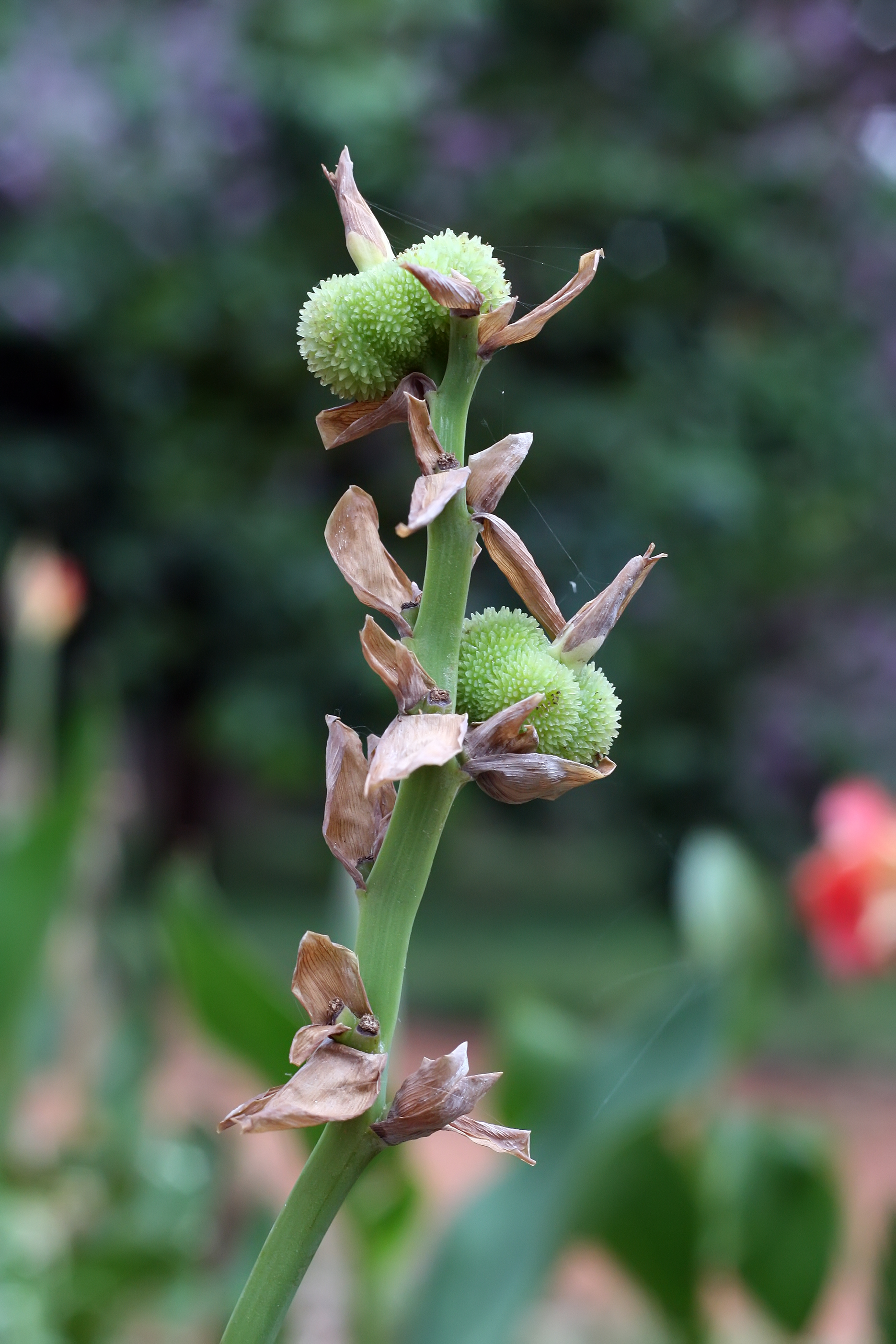
Canna fruits

Seeds are produced from sexual reproduction, involving the transfer of pollen from the stamen of the pollen parent onto the stigma of the seed parent. In the case of Canna, the same plant can usually play the roles of both pollen and seed parents, technically referred to as a hermaphrodite. However, the cultivars of the Italian group and triploids are almost always seed sterile, and their pollen has a low fertility level. Mutations are almost always totally sterile.

Canna seeds have a very hard seed coat, which contributes to their dormancy. Germination is facilitated by scarification of the seed coat, which can be accomplished by several techniques.

Pollination

The species are capable of self-pollination, but most cultivars require an outside pollinator. All cannas produce nectar, so attract nectar-consuming insects, bats, and hummingbirds, that act as the transfer agent, spreading pollen between stamens and stigmas on the same or different flowers.

Genetic changes

Since genetic recombination has occurred, a cultivar grown from seed will have different characteristics from its parent(s), thus should never be given a parent's name. The wild species have evolved in the absence of other Canna genes and are usually true to type when the parents are of the same species, but a degree of variance still occurs. The species C. indica is an aggregate species, having many different and extreme forms ranging from the giant to miniature, from large foliage to small foliage, both green and dark foliage, and many differently coloured blooms of red, orange, pink, or yellow, and combinations of those colours.

==== Asexual propagation ====
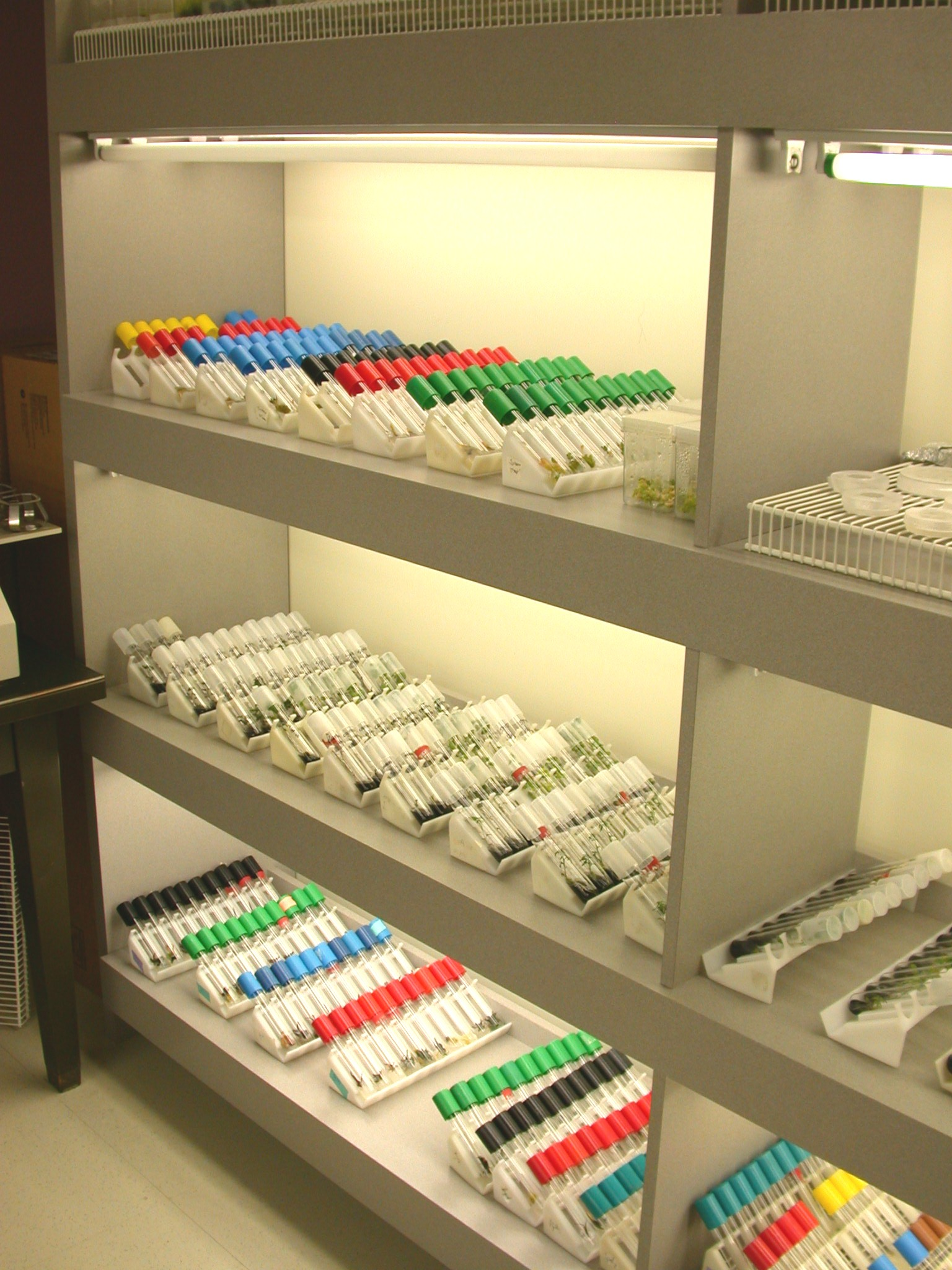
In vitro culture of plants in a controlled, sterile environment

Division of plant parts

Outside of a laboratory, the only effective asexual propagation method is rhizome division. This uses material from a single parent, and as no exchange of genetic material occurs, it almost always produces plants that are identical to the parent. After a summer's growth, the horticultural cultivars can be separated into typically four or five separate smaller rhizomes, each with a growing nodal point (growing eye). Without the growing point, which is composed of meristem material, the rhizome will not grow.

Micropropagation

Micropropagation, also known as tissue culture, is the practice of rapidly multiplying stock plant material to produce a large number of progeny plants. Micropropagation uses in vitro division of small pieces in a sterile environment, where they first produce proliferations of tissue, which are then separated into small pieces that are treated differently so that they produce roots and new stem tissue. The steps in the process are regulated by different ratios of plant growth regulators. Many commercial organizations have produced cannas this way, and specifically the "Island Series" of cannas was introduced by means of mass-produced plants using this technique. However, cannas have a reputation for being difficult micropropagation candidates.

Micropropagation techniques can be employed to disinfest plants of a virus. In the growing tip of a plant, cell division is so rapid that the younger cells may not have had time to be infected with the virus. The rapidly growing region of meristem cells producing the shoot tip is cut off and placed in vitro, with a very high probability of being uncontaminated by virus.

== General and cited references ==
- Sass, C; Iles, WJ; Barrett, CF; Smith, SY; Specht, CD (21 January 2016). "Revisiting the Zingiberales: using multiplexed exon capture to resolve ancient and recent phylogenetic splits in a charismatic plant lineage". PeerJ. 4 e1584. doi:10.7717/peerj.1584. PMC 4727956. PMID 26819846.
