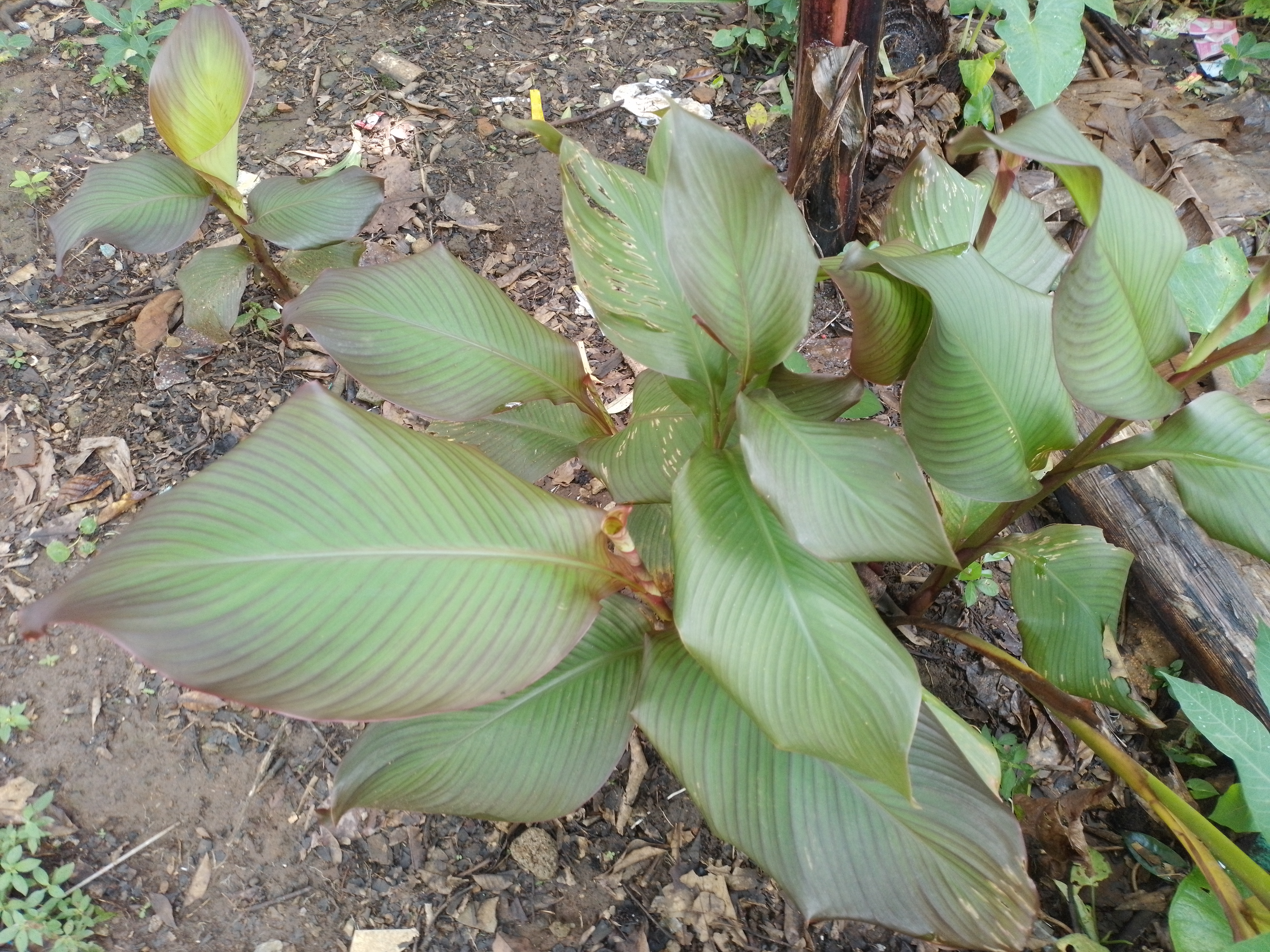

Scientific classification
- Kingdom: Plantae
- Clade: Tracheophytes
- Clade: Angiosperms
- Clade: Monocots
- Clade: Commelinids
- Order: Zingiberales
- Family: Cannaceae
- Genus: Canna
- Species: C. discolor

Binomial name
- Canna discolor Lindl.

= Canna discolor =

Species of flowering plant

Canna discolor also known as Achira in Colombia is a species of the Canna genus, belonging to the family Cannaceae, found naturally in the range from South Mexico to Colombia, widely introduced elsewhere. It is a perennial growing to 3m. It is hardy to zone 10 and is frost tender. In the north latitudes it is in flower from August to October, and the seeds ripen in October. The flowers are hermaphrodite.

More than other Canna species, C. discolor is used extensively in agriculture in Asia. It grows high yields of very large rhizomes, sometimes the size of a man's arm, exceedingly rich in starch.

== Synonyms ==
- C. achiras
- 'Brick Canna'

== Taxonomy ==
In the last three decades of the 20th century, Canna species have been categorised by two different taxonomists, Paulus Johannes Maria Maas from the Netherlands and Nobuyuki Tanaka from Japan. Inevitably, there are differences in their categorisations.

Maas considers Canna discolor to be a synonym of C. indica L., however, Tanaka's studies have revealed that C. indica can be clearly distinguished from other taxa, as a result he recognises several varieties:

Canna discolor var. discolor (Lindl.) Nb.Tanaka, 2001

A triploid, sterile both ways.

Canna discolor var. rubripunctata Nb.Tanaka, 2001

Green leaves with yellow flowers and many red spots. Seed parent sterile.

Canna discolor var. viridifolia Nb.Tanaka, 2001

No details available.

== See also ==
- Canna
- List of Canna species
- List of Canna cultivars
