= Canna virus =

The genus Canna is susceptible to certain plant viruses, which may result in spotted or streaked leaves, in a mild form, but can finally result in stunted growth and twisted and distorted blooms and foliage. Known species of virus are:

- Canna yellow mottle badnavirus (CYMV) infecting canna species.
- Bean yellow mosaic virus (BYMV) infecting cannas, gladiolus, freesia and many legumes.
- Tomato aspermy virus (TAV), causes mosaic in cannas, but it has not been reported affecting cannas in the UK.
- Cucumber mosaic virus (CMV), cannas are susceptible to this virus, but none found yet in England.
- Canna yellow streak virus (CaYSV), recently discovered by scientists at the Central Science Laboratory in England. Dr Rick Mumford, senior virologist at CSL is quoted as stating "Typical virus symptoms include flecking, mosaic, leaf streaking and necrosis, which in severe cases render plants unsaleable." The reference to this quoted article is shown below.

== Known facts ==
Overall, very little is known about the Canna viruses, but the following points are generally accepted:

- It manifests itself in rust coloured streaks or mottled markings on the leaves and in colour breaks on the flowers.
- Sometimes leaves are slightly distorted and puckered.
- Like many plants under stress, affected cannas will flower very early in the season and before the plant is full height.
- Over the years the canna will lose vigour and become increasingly unsightly.
- Some are spread by aphids and other sap sucking insects.
- At one time it was thought that Cannas may have the ability to outgrow the virus, but that is not the case.
- Most authorities advise to burn all affected cannas and start again.
- Keep any new introductions well away from potentially infected stock.
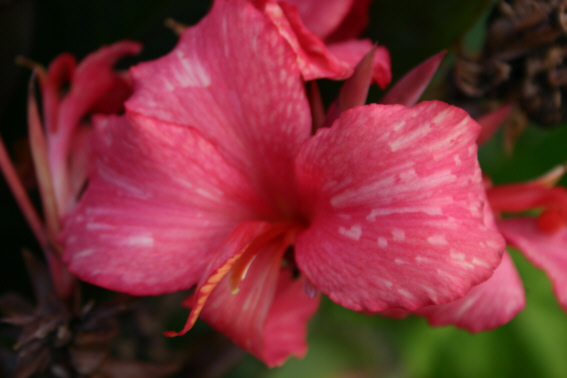
Virus causes colour breaks in flowers

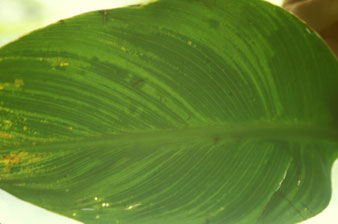
CYMV infected foliage

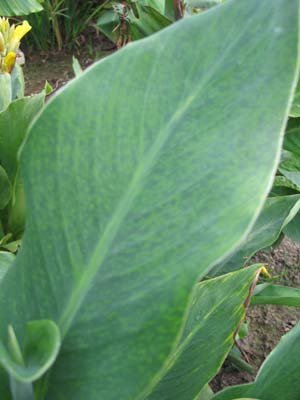
BYMV infected foliage

== References to CYMV ==
- Lockhart BEL, 1988. Occurrence of Canna Yellow Mottle Virus in North America. Acta Horticolturae. 234, 69–72.
- Lockhart BEL, 1990. Evidence for a Double-Stranded Circular DNA Genome in a second Group of Plant Viruses. The American Phytopathology Society, 80, No 2.
- Momol MT., Lockhart BEL, Dankers H, Adkins S, 2004. Canna yellow mottle virus detected in canna in Florida. Online. Plant Health Progress doi:10.1094/PHP-2004-0809-01-HN.
- Nodwora TC, Lochkart BEL, 2000. Development of a serological assay for detecting serologically diverse banana streak virus isolates. Acta Horticolturae 540, 377–388.
- Yamashita S, Natsuaki T, Doi Y, Yora K, 1985. Canna yellow mottle virus, a non-enveloped small-bacilliform virus in Canna sp. Annals of Phytopathological Society of Japan 51, 642–646.

== References to BYMV ==
- Barnett, O.W., Randles, J.W. and Burrows, P.M. (1987). Phytopathology 77: 791.
- Bays, D.C. and Demski, J.W. (1986). Plant Dis. 70: 667.
- Bos, L. (1970). Neth. J. Pl. Path. 76: 8.
- Bos, L. (1970). CMI/AAB Descr. Pl. Viruses No. 40, 4 pp.
- Bos, L., Kowalska, C. and Maat, D.Z. (1974). Neth. J. Pl. Path. 80: 173.
- Bos, L., Lindsten, K. and Maat, D.Z. (1977). Neth. J. Pl. Path. 83: 97.
- Brierley, P. and Smith, F.F. (1948). Phytopathology 38: 230.
- Doolittle, S.P. and Jones, F.R. (1925). Phytopathology 15: 763.
- Edwardson, J.R. (1974). Fla Agric. Exp. Stn Monog. No. 5, p. 22.
- Hampton, R., Beczner, L., Hagedorn, P., Bos, L., Inouye, T., Barnett, O.W., Musil, M. and Meiners, J. (1978). Phytopathology 68: 989.
- Ghabrial, S.A., Pickard, C.M. and Stuckey, R.E. (1977). Pl. Dis. Reptr 61: 690.
- Horváth, J. (1979a). Acta Phytopath. Acad. Sci. Hung. 14: 100.057.
- Horváth, J. (1979b). Acta Phytopath. Acad. Sci. Hung. 14: 147.
- Jones, R.T. and Diachun, S. (1977). Phytopathology 67: 831.
- Johnstone, G.R. and McLean, GD (1987). Ann. appl. Biol. 110: 421.
- Komuro, Y. and Iwaki, M. (1968). Ann. Phytopath. Soc. Japan 34: 7.
- Lindsten, K., Brishammas, S. and Tominius, K. (1976). Meddn St. VäxtskAnst. 16: 289.
- Lisa, V. and Dellavalle, G. (1987). Pl. Path. 36: 214.
- McLaughlin, MR (1988). Plant Dis. 72: 539.
- Moghal, SM and Francki, RIB. (1976). Virology 73: 350.
- Moghal, SM and Francki, RIB. (1981). Virology 112: 210.
- Nagel, J., Zettler, F.W. and Hiebert, E. (1983). Phytopathology 73: 449.
- Paludan, N., Heide, M., Begtrup, J. and Borkhardt, B. (1988). Acta Hort. 234: 53.
- Pierce, W.H. (1934). Phytopathology 24: 87.
- Randles, J.W., Davies, J.W., Gibbs, AJ. and Hatta, T. (1980). Aust. J. biol. Sci. 33: 245.
- Reddick, B.B. and Barnett, O.W. (1983). Phytopathology 73: 1506.
- Schmelzer, K., Schmidt, H.E. and Beczner, L. (1973). Biol. Zbl. 92: 211.
- Taraku, N., Juretic, N. and Milicic, D. (1977). Acta bot. Croat. 36: 47
- Taylor, N.L., Ghabrial, S.A., Diachun, S. and Cornelius, P.L. (1986). Crop Science 26: 68.
- Thornberry, HH (1966). In: Index of Plant Virus Diseases U.S. Dep. Agric. Hdbk No. 307.
- Van Regenmortel, M.H.V. (1964). Virology 23: 495.
- Wetter, C. (1960). Arch. Microbiol. 37: 278.

== References to Tomato aspermy virus ==
- Ainsworth, G.C. (1939). Rep. Exp. Res. Stn Cheshunt, 1938, p. 60.
- Bernal, J.J., Moriones, E. and Garcia-Arenal, F. (1991). J. gen. Virol. 72: 2191.
- Blencowe, J.W. and Caldwell, J. (1949). Ann. appl. Biol. 36: 320.
- Brierley, P. (1955). Phytopathology 45: 2.
- Brierley, P. and Lorentz, P. (1960). Phytopathology 50: 404.
- Christie, R.G. and Edwardson, J.R. (1977). Fla Agric. Exp. Stn Monog. No. 9, p. 89.
- Dunez, J. and Monsion, M. (1968). "Possibilités de Régénération des Chrysanthèmes Contaminés par les Virus dé L'aspèrmie Et dé la Mosaïque." Etudes de virologie 19: 165.
- Govier, D.A. (1957). Ann. appl. Biol. 45: 62.
- Grogan, R.G., Uyemoto, JK and Kimble, K.A. (1963). Virology 21: 36.
- Habili, N. and Francki, RIB. (1974a). Virology 57: 392.
- Habili, N. and Francki, RIB. (1974b). Virology 60: 29.
- Hollings, M. (1955). Ann. appl. Biol. 43: 86.
- Hollings, M. and Kassanis, B. (1957). J. R. hort. Soc. 82: 339.
- Hollings, M. and Stone, O.M. (1969). Rep. Glasshouse Crops Res. Inst. 1967, p. 95.
- Hollings, M and Stone, O.M. (1971). CMI/AAB Descr. Pl. Viruses No. 79, 4 pp.
- Hollings, M., Stone, O.M. and Brunt, A.A. (1968). Rep. Glasshouse Crops Res. Inst. 1968, p. 95.
- Hull, R. (1976). Virology 75: 18.
- Kennedy, J.S., Day, MF and Eastop, V.F. (1962). A Conspectus of Aphids as Vectors of Plant Viruses. Comm. Inst. Ent., London.
- Lot, H., Marrou, J., Quiot, J.B. and Esvan, C. (1972). Annls. Phytopath. 4: 25.
- Marani, F. (1969). Phytopathol. Medit. 8: 142.
- Moriones, E., Roossinck, M. and Garcia-Arenal, F. (1991). J. gen. Virol. 72: 779.
- Noordam, D. (1952). Tijdschr. PlZiekt. 58: 121.
- Noordam, D., Bijl, M., Overbeek, S.C. and Quiniones, S.S. (1965). Neth. J. Pl. Path. 71: 61.
- O'Reilly, D., Thomas, C.J.R. and Coutts, RHA (1991). J. gen. Virol. 72: 1.
- Oertel, C. (1967). Zbl. Bakt. ParasitKde. Abt. 2, 121: 276.
- Stace-Smith, R. and Tremaine, J.H. (1973). Virology 51: 401.
- Waterworth, H.E., Monroe, R.L. and Kahn, R.P. (1973). Phytopathology 63: 93.
- Wilson, P.A. and Symons, RH (1981). Virology 112: 342.

== References to CaYSV ==
- "The Commercial Greenhouse Grower", UK, edition June 2007, page 5.

== References to CMV ==
- Pub Med References

== See also ==
- Canna
- List of Canna species
- List of Canna cultivars
