= Kayamb =

Musical Instrument

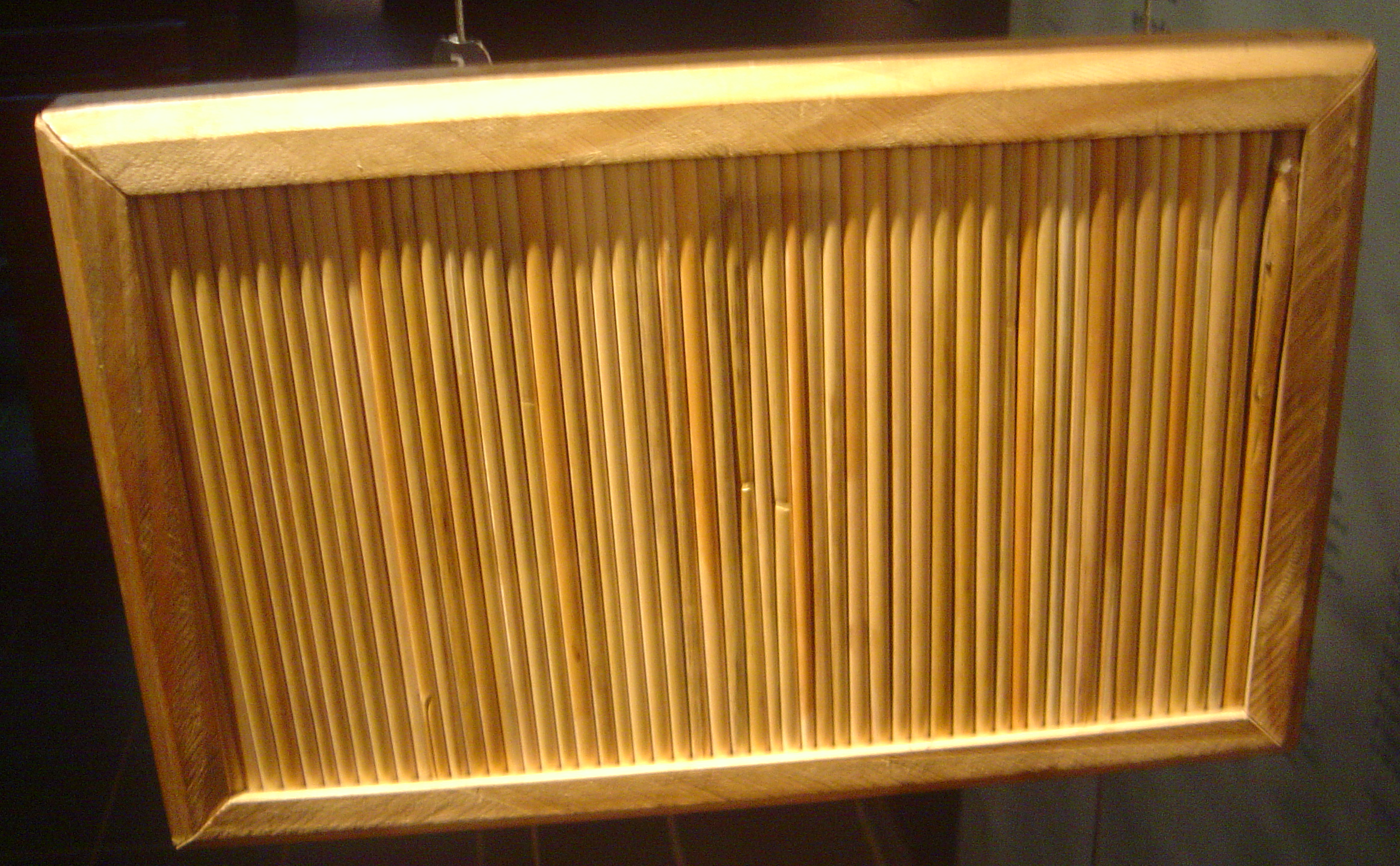
A kayamba

The kayamb or kayamba is a flat musical instrument, a shaken idiophone, used in the African countries to play different types of music. It is called maravanne in Mauritius, or caïamb or kayanm in Reunion.

Kayambas are made of reed (or sugar cane flower stems) and its tubes filled with jequirity or canna seeds.

They are also played in some East African countries like Kenya.
