= Canna leaf roller =

Common name for several butterfly species

Canna leaf roller refers to two different Lepidoptera species that are pests of cultivated cannas. Caterpillars of the Brazilian skipper butterfly (Calpodes ethlius), also known as the larger canna leaf roller, cut the leaves and roll them over to live inside while pupating and eating the leaf. In addition, caterpillars of the lesser canna leaf roller (Geshna cannalis), a grass moth, will sew the leaves shut before they can unfurl by spinning a silk thread around the leaf. The resultant leaf damage can be distressing to a gardener.
