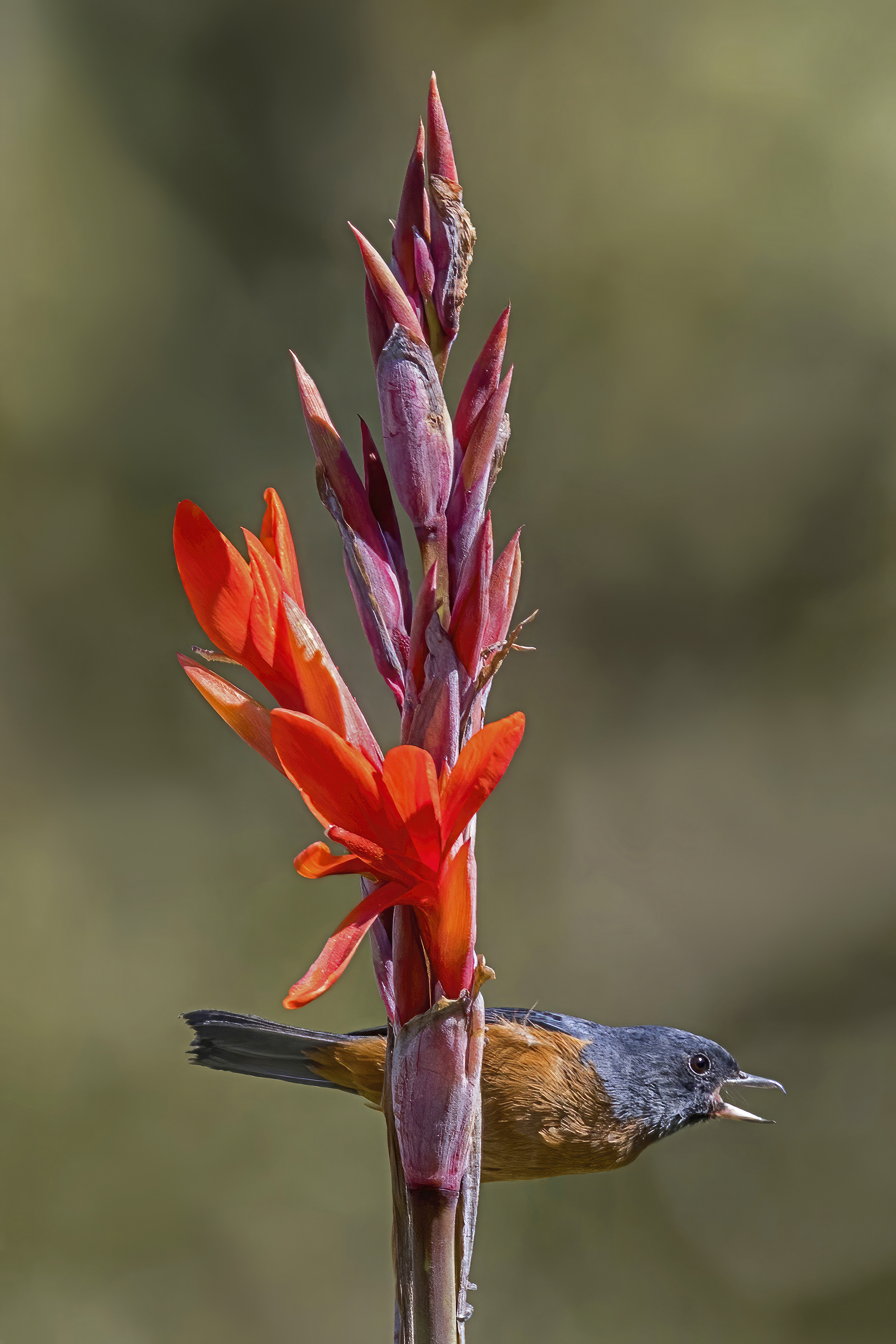
- With Cinnamon-bellied flowerpiercer in Antigua Guatemala

Conservation status
- Apparently Secure (NatureServe)

Scientific classification
- Kingdom: Plantae
- Clade: Tracheophytes
- Clade: Angiosperms
- Clade: Monocots
- Clade: Commelinids
- Order: Zingiberales
- Family: Cannaceae
- Genus: Canna
- Species: C. indica

Binomial name
- Canna indica L.

Synonyms
- List: Canna annaei André.; Canna aurantiaca Roscoe.; Canna barbadica Bouché; Canna bidentata Bertol.; Canna carnea Roscoe; Canna cearensis Huber.; Canna chinensis Willd.; Canna cinnabarina Bouché; Canna coccinea var. bicolor Kraenzl.; Canna commutata Bouché; Canna compacta Bouché; Canna concinna Bouché.; Canna crocea Lag. ex Rchb.; Canna crocea Roem. & Schult.; Canna densifolia Bouché; Canna edulis Ker Gawl.; Canna ehrenbergii Bouché; Canna ellipticifolia Stokes; Canna esculenta Loudon; Canna exigua Bouché; Canna flavescens Link; Canna floribunda Bouché; Canna formosa Bouché; Canna fulgida Bouché; Canna glauca var. annaei Petersen.; Canna heliconiifolia Bouché; Canna heliconiifolia var. xalapensis (Horan.) Kraenzl.; Canna juncea Retz.; Canna laeta Bouché; Canna lagunensis Lindl.; Canna lambertii Lindl.; Canna leptochila Bouché; Canna lutea Mill.; Canna lutea Larrañaga; Canna lutea var. aurantiaca Regel; Canna lutea var. genuina Kraenzl.; Canna lutea var. maculata (Hook.) Petersen; Canna lutea var. pallida Kraenzl.; Canna maculata (Hook) Link.; Canna maxima Lodd. ex Roscoe; Canna moritziana Bouché; Canna napalensis Wall. ex Bouché; Canna nepalensis D.Dietr.; Canna occidentalis Roscoe; Canna orientalis Bouché; Canna orientalis Roscoe; Canna orientalis var. flava Roscoe; Canna pallida Roscoe; Canna pentaphylla D.Dietr.; Canna plurituberosa T.Koyama & Nob.Tanaka; Canna poeppigii Bouché; Canna polyclada Wawra; Canna polymorpha Lodd. ex Loudon; Canna portoricensis Bouché; Canna pulchra Hassk.; Canna pulchra Bouché ex Horan.; Canna rubra (Aiton) Willd.; Canna rubricaulis Link; Canna sanctae-rosae Kraenzl.; Canna sanguinea Warsz. ex Otto & A.Dietr.; Canna sanguinea Bouché; Canna saturate-rubra Bouché ex K.Koch; Canna seleriana Kraenzl.; Canna sellowii Bouché; Canna speciosa Hegetschw; Canna speciosa Roscoe ex Sims; Canna spectabilis Bouché; Canna sulphurea Bouché; Canna surinamensis Bouché; Canna tenuiflora Bouché; Canna textoria Noronha; Canna thyrsiflora Hegetschw.; Canna tinei Tod.; Canna variabilis Willd.; Canna variegata Besser; Canna variegata Bouché; Canna variegatifolia Ciciar.; Canna ventricosa Bouché; Canna warszewiczii var. flameus Ram. Goyena; Canna xalapensis Horan.

= Canna indica =

Species of flowering plant

Canna indica, commonly known as Indian shot, African arrowroot, edible canna, purple arrowroot, Sierra Leone arrowroot, is a plant species in the family Cannaceae. It is native to the Americas and naturalized elsewhere. The edible rhizomes are a source of starch.

== Description ==
Canna indica is a perennial growing to between 0.5 and 2.5 metres (1 1/2 and 8 feet), depending on the variety. It is hardy to zone 10 and is frost tender. The plants form an upright, unbranched stem or the overlapping leaf sheaths form a pseudo trunk.

It forms branched rhizomes 60 centimetres (24 inches) long that are divided into bulbous segments and covered in two lines by pale green or purple flaky leaves. The surface of the rhizome is carved by transverse grooves, which mark the base of scales that cover it. From the lower part white and apex rootlets emerge, where there are numerous buds, the leaves sprout, the floral stem and the stems. The very large grains of starch can supposedly be seen with the naked eye.

The alternate and spiral or two-line arranged, very large, simple leaves are divided into leaf sheaths, short petioles and leaf blades. The leaf blade has a length of 30 to 60 cm (12 to 24 in) and a width of 10 to 20 cm (4 to 8 in). The parallel leaf veins arise from the midrib (not typical of monocots). The leaves are broad, green or violet green, with elliptical sheets, which can measure 30 to 60 cm (12 to 24 in) long and 10 to 25 cm (3.9 to 9.8 in) wide, with the base obtuse or narrowly cuneate and the apex is shortly acuminate or sharp.

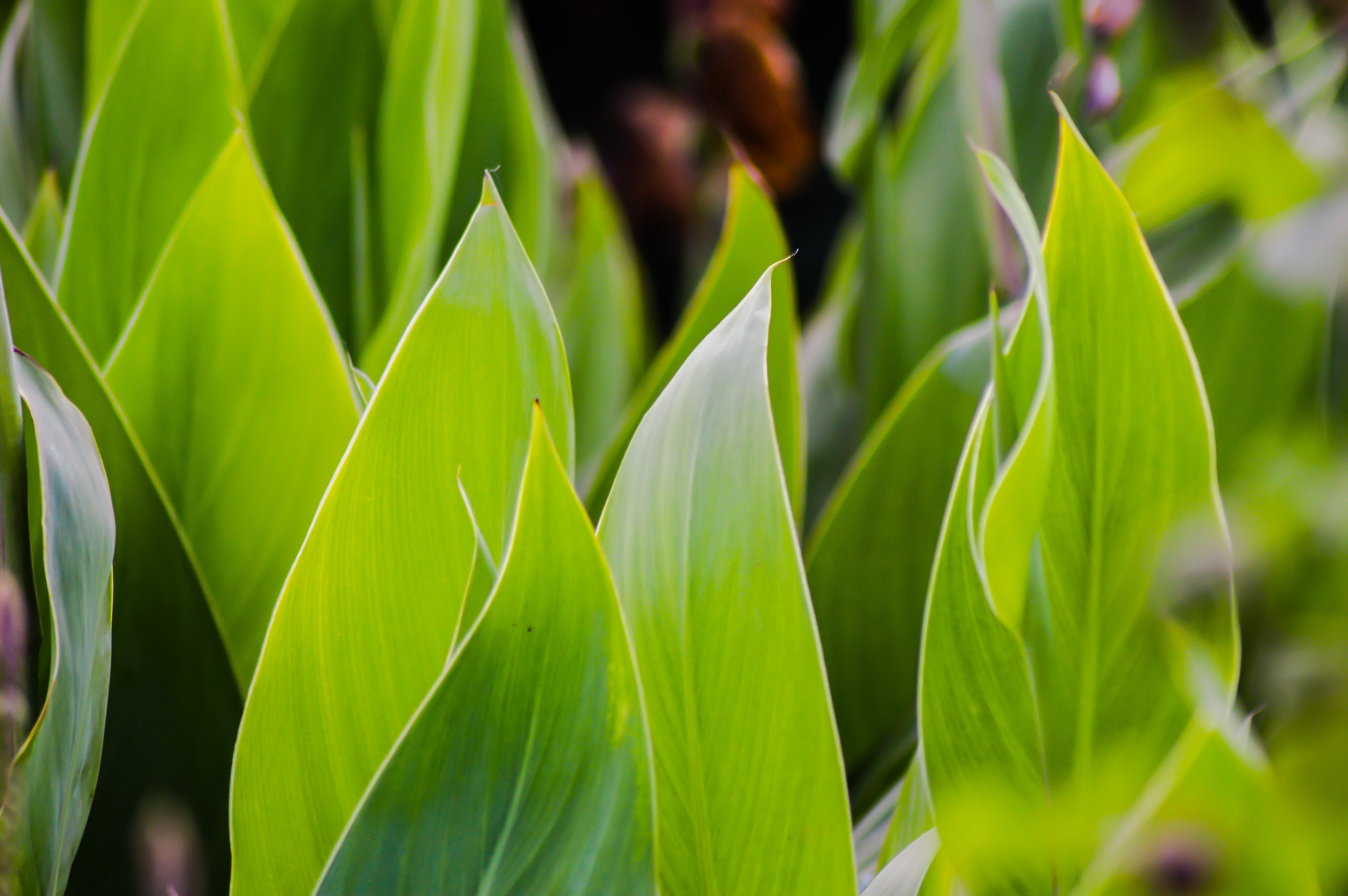
Leaves

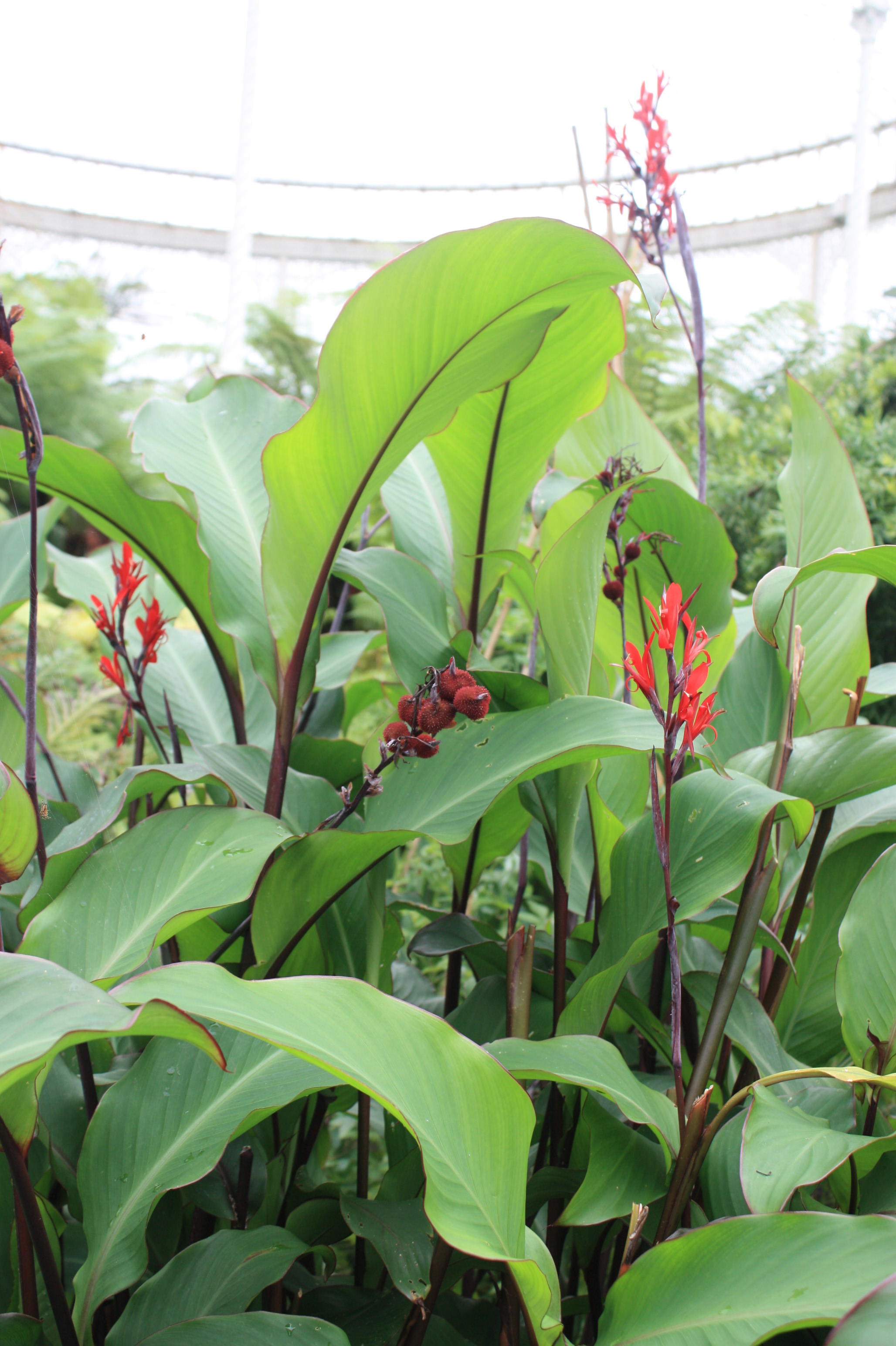
In bloom

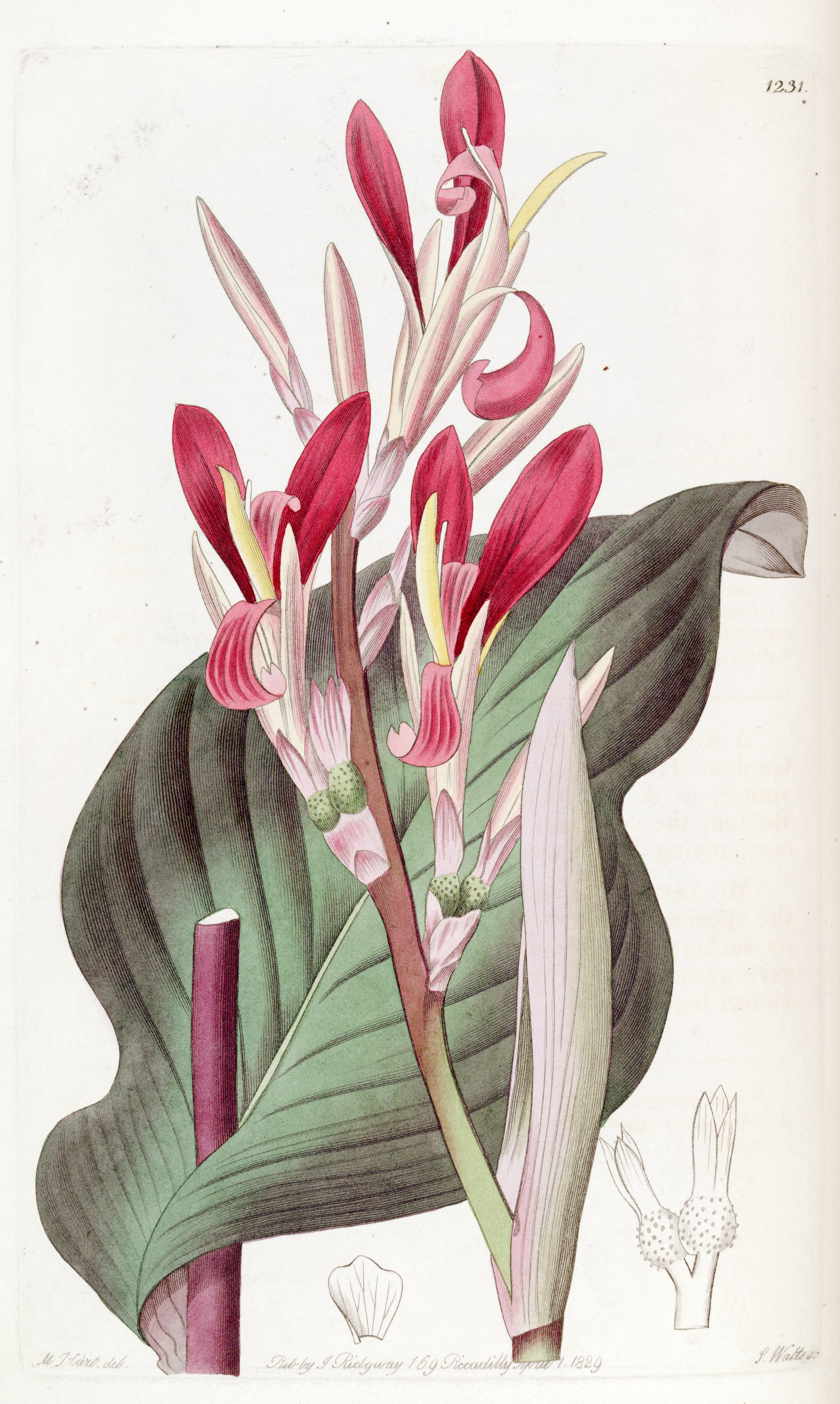
Illustration

=== Flowers ===
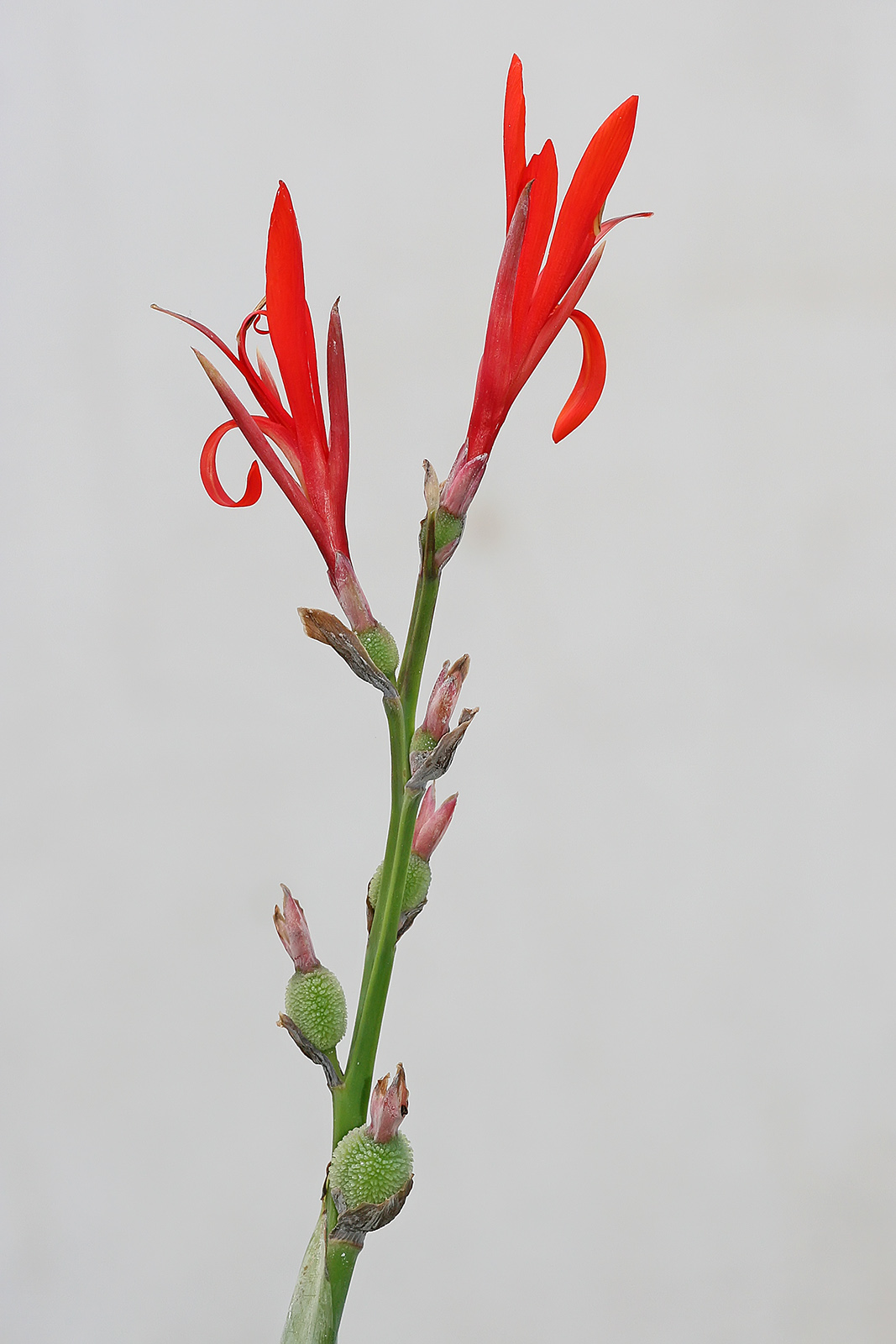
Flowers and capsules

The flowers are hermaphrodite. The mostly large flowers are zygomorphic and threefold. On pedicels, they are 0.2–1 cm (1/8–3/8 in) long, red or yellow-orange, except in some cultivars, 4.5–7.5 cm (2–3 in) long, with the sepals being closely triangular, 1–1.7 cm (1/2–3/4 in) long and the petals erect, 4–6.5 cm (1.6–2.6 in) long. The tube is 1.5–2 cm (0.59–0.79 in) long.

The bracts are designed differently. The three free sepals are usually green. The three petals are green or have depending on the variety shades of yellow about orange and red to pink. The base of the petals is fused with the staminodien to a stamen column. There are two circles, each with originally three stamens present. The petals and staminodes are usually yellow to red. The three carpels are at a constant under (syncarp) ovary adherent which has a soft-spiky surface and many central-angle-constant ovules. The pollen is deposited on the abaxial (off-axis) surface of the stylus.

The pollination mechanism is very specialised and the pollination is done by insects. The insects pick up the pollen from the flattened style. In their natural habitat, blooming occurs in the months of August to October. The fruits are ellipsoid capsules to globose, warty, 1.5 to 3 cm (0.59 to 1.18 in) long, chestnut coloured, with a large amount of black and very hard seeds.

=== Seeds ===
The seeds are small, globular, black pellets, hard and dense enough to sink in water. They resemble shotgun pellets giving rise to the plant's common name of Indian shot. They are hard enough to shoot through wood and still survive and later germinate.

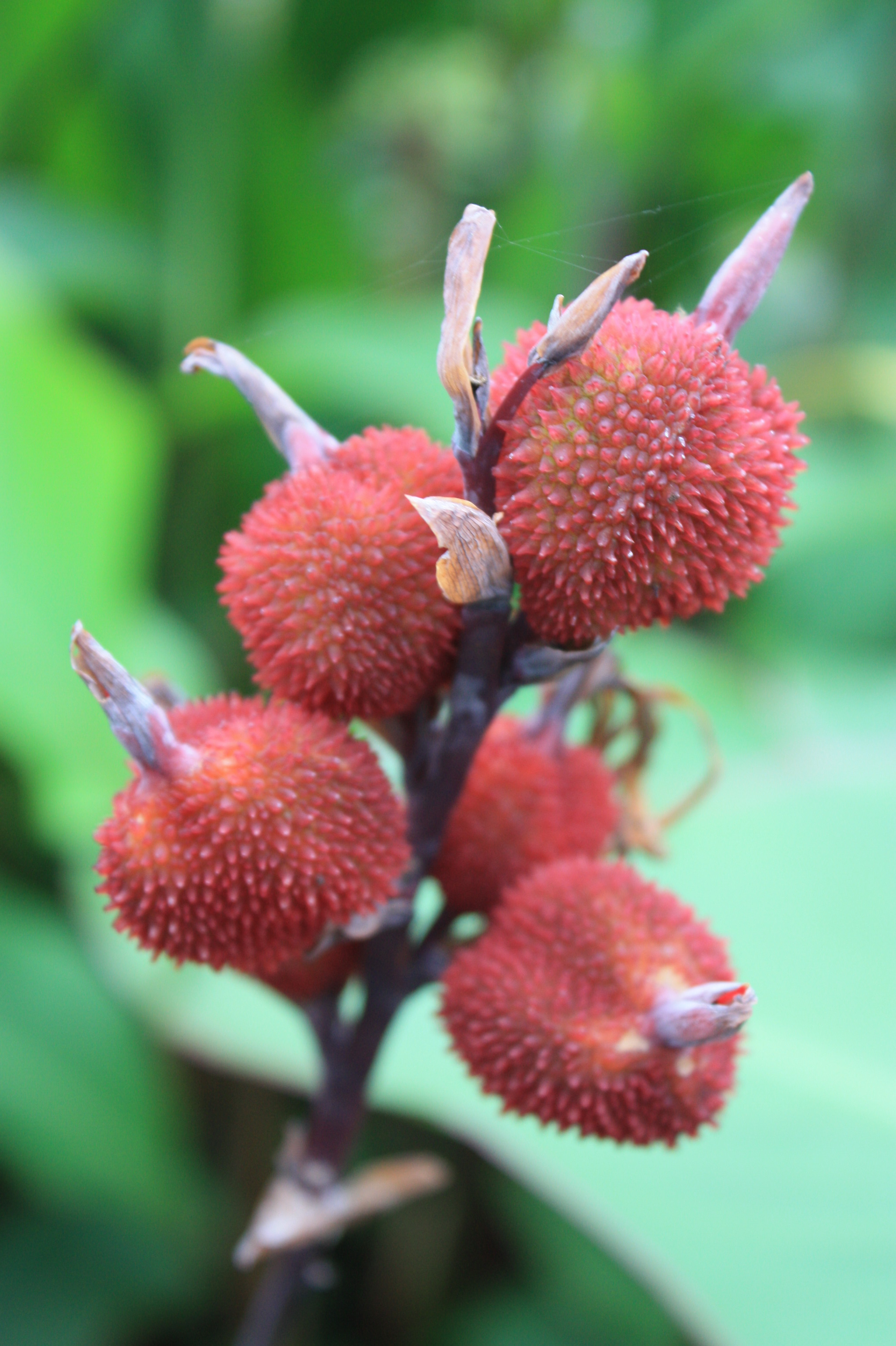
Fruit

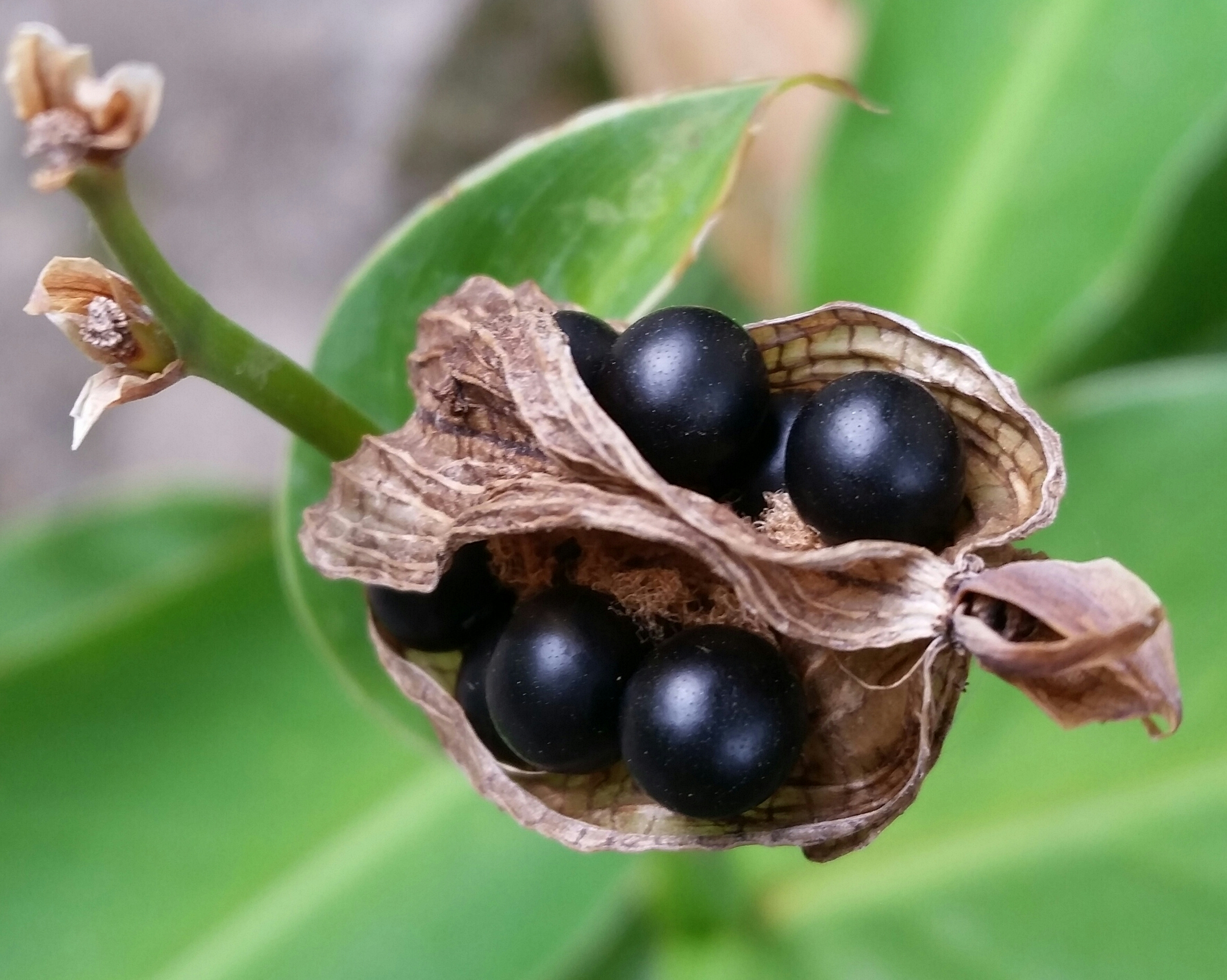
Capsules and seeds

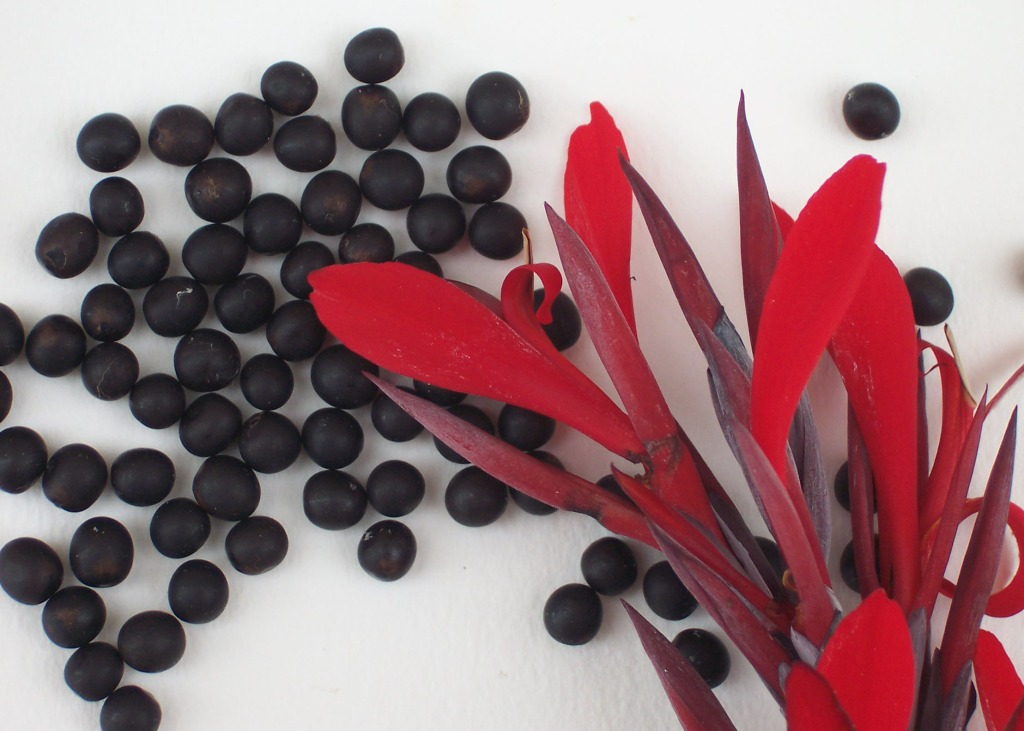
Seeds with flower for scale

== Taxonomy ==
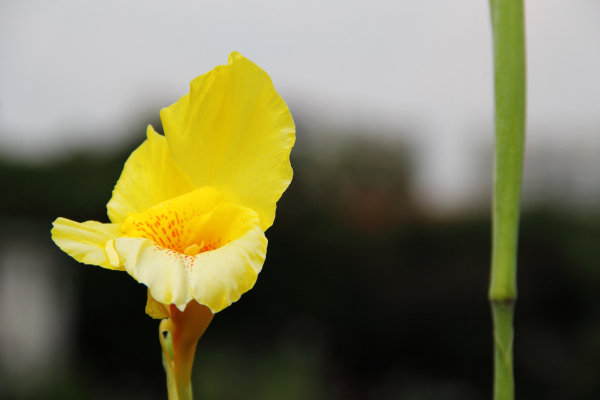
Flower of C. indica var. flava

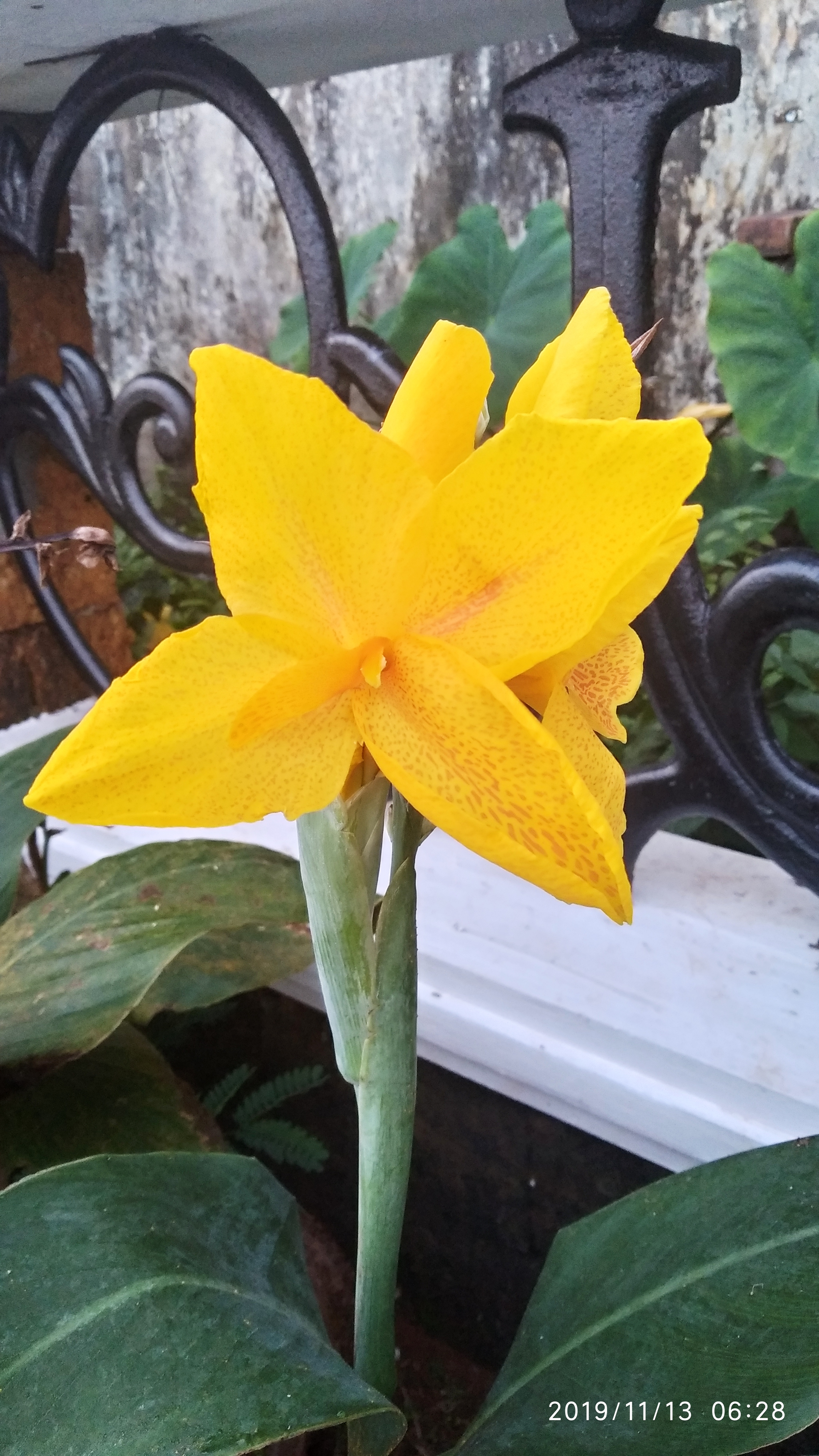
C. indica, commonly known as Indian shot, Tagore Park Mahe District, Puducherry UT, India

In the last three decades of the 20th century, Canna species have been categorised by two different taxonomists, Paulus Johannes Maria Maas from the Netherlands and Nobuyuki Tanaka from Japan. Maas regards C. coccinea, C. compacta, C. discolor, C. patens and C. speciosa as synonyms or varieties of C. indica, while Tanaka recognises several additional varieties of C. indica.

- Canna indica var. indica L.

A medium sized species; green foliage, oblong shaped, spreading habit; triangular flower stems, coloured green; spikes of flowers are erect, self-coloured red, staminodes are long and narrow, edges regular, petals red, partial self-cleaning; fertile both ways, self-pollinating and also true to type, capsules globose; rhizomes are thick, up to 3 cm in diameter, coloured purple; tillering is prolific. Introduced by Linnaeus.

- Canna indica var. flava (Roscoe ex Baker) Nb. Tanaka

Yellow bloom. Many plants previously offered as C. lutea fall into this subspecies.

- Canna indica var. maculata (Hook) Nb. Tanaka

A medium sized species; green foliage, ovoid shaped, branching habit; spikes of flowers are erect, yellow with red spots, staminodes are long and narrow, edges regular, petals green, fully self-cleaning, low bloomer; fertile both ways, self-pollinating and also true to type, capsules globose; rhizomes are thick, up to 3 cm (1.2 in) in diameter, coloured white and pink; tillering is average. Introduced by Hook.. Many plants previously offered as C. lutea fall into this subspecies.

- Canna indica var. sanctae rosea (Kraenzl) Nb. Tanaka

A small species; green foliage, oval shaped, white margin, branching habit; spikes of flowers are erect, self-coloured pink, staminodes are long and narrow, edges regular, labellum is pink, stamen is pink, style is pink, petals red with farina, fully self-cleaning; fertile both ways, self-pollinating and also true to type, capsules ellipsoid; rhizomes are thick, up to 3 cm (1.2 in) in diameter, coloured white and pink; tillering is prolific.

- Canna indica var. warszewiczii (A.Dietr.) Nb.Tanaka

This variety is distinguishable from C. indica var. indica by having purple-red-margined leaves, purple-red fruits and slightly corm-like thickened terrestrial stem at the base. Additionally to this, there are normally two staminodes, recurved backwards, and the stamen is often strongly reflexed at the apex. These characteristics are fairly stable in this taxon. Sometimes, this variety is confused with C. discolor Lindl., from which it differs in much smaller, deep-red coloured flowers, short and slender rhizomes and chromosome numbers (2n=27 in C. discolor and 2n=18 in C. indica var. warszewiczii)

John Gilbert Baker recognizes 2 varieties: Canna indica var. napalensis (Wall. ex Bouché) and Canna indica var. orientalis (Roscoe), William Aiton recognizes 2 varieties of Canna indica var. lutea (Mill.) and Canna indica var. rubra, and Eduard August von Regel recognizes one variety of Canna indica var. edwardsii.

== Distribution and habitat ==
Canna indica is native to much of South America: Colombia, Venezuela, Ecuador, Peru, Brazil, Uruguay and Argentina as well as the West Indies and Central America.

In modern times, it is also naturalized in the southeastern United States (Florida, Texas, Louisiana, and South Carolina), and much of Europe, sub-Saharan Africa, Southeast Asia, and Oceania. C. indica is reportedly naturalized in Austria, Portugal, Spain, Azores, Canary Islands, Cape Verde, Madeira, most of tropical Africa, Ascension Island, St. Helena, Madagascar, China, Japan, Taiwan, the Bonin Islands, India, Nepal, Sri Lanka, Cambodia, Laos, Thailand, Vietnam, Burma, Java, Malaysia, the Philippines, Christmas Island, the Bismarck Archipelago, Norfolk Island, New South Wales, Queensland, Fiji, Tonga, Vanuatu, Kiribati, the Cook Islands, the Society Islands, the Caroline Islands and Hawaii.

Canna can be cultivated from sea level to 2,700 m (8,860 ft) above sea level, but thrives in temperate, tropical or subtropical mountain climates, between 1,000 and 2,000 m (3,280 and 6,560 ft) above sea level (in humid tropical climates for higher elevations) at a mean temperature of 14 to 27 °C. The plant prefers a mean annual rainfall between 1,000–4,500 millimetres (3 1/2–15 ft), but it can tolerate 500–5,000 mm per year. Canna prefers light sandy-loamy soils, but can also grow on heavy soils, as far as they are not wet. It is indifferent to soil pH. For seeds to germinate, they must soak in water for two to three days.

== Ecology ==
=== Diseases ===
Cannas suffer from relatively few diseases compared to other species. Nevertheless, some diseases have been recorded to affect C. indica. One of them is Canna rust (Puccinia thaliae), a fungus that causes orange spots on the leaves. In addition, plant viruses occur: Hippeastrum mosaic virus, Tomato aspermy virus, Canna yellow mottle virus and Canna yellow streak virus which can cause mild or strong symptoms from streaked leaves, stunted growth to distorted blooms. Furthermore, there is Botrytis, a mold that affects the flowers.

Many different Canna varieties exist, and some of them are resistant to a certain type of disease. To prevent mold, the soil should be well-drained without too much soil moisture or stagnating water. To diminish the risk of spreading diseases, dead and infected leaves should be removed.

=== Pests ===
The canna leaf roller butterfly (Calpodes ethlius) has been seen on Canna plants in the US. It is a caterpillar known as the worst pest for this plant and primarily found in the Southern United States. This pest causes damages by laying its eggs in the bud of developing stalks. To protect the eggs from predators and insecticide, caterpillars use sticky webs to keep the leaves from unfurling. The pupate then feed on the leaves which can lead to losses of yield due to reduced photosynthesis.

The Japanese beetle (Popillia japonica) is another leaf ragging pest with mainly small consequences for Canna plants. This beetle feeds on the part of the leaves between the veins. In its originating region in Japan, it does not cause a lot of damages. However, in the US it has no natural predator and can cause serious damages on Cannas and other plants.

The bird cherry-oat aphid (Rhopalosiphum padi) has been recorded to affect stored rhizomes. Although this pest has not been causing severe damages yet, it can particularly affect plants grown in greenhouses and can be combatted with parasitical wasps. It is a more common pest on cereals.

=== As an invasive species ===
C. indica has been included in the Global Invasive Species Database and has been declared as invasive in the following places:

- South Africa where it is categorised as a category 1b Invader in terms of the National Environmental Management: Biodiversity Act (10/2004) list of Alien and Invasive Species which prohibits their cultivation, propagation, translocation and trade, and requires them to be removed and destroyed when found. This is because it competes with and replaces indigenous species, often in waterways and marshy areas.
- Australia, regarded as a weed in New South Wales and South Eastern Queensland
- Pacific Islands, where it has been included in the list of plant threats to Pacific ecosystems as a high-risk species
- Tanzania, where although it was included in a list of 41 'problem' plants in the Serengeti-Mara ecosystem, it has been assessed to be naturalised in tourist areas, but not invasive (using roadside surveys)
- Ghana, where it was noted to compete with and invade natural shrub and tree woodland vegetation in the Boabeng-Fiema Monkey Sanctuary and Kakum National Park

== Cultivation ==
Canna indica (achira) has been cultivated by indigenous peoples of the Americas in tropical America for thousands of years. The place of the first domestication may have been the northern Andes, as may be true of other similar root crops such as Calathea allouia and M. arundinacea. The Cauca River valley of Colombia was a center of early domestication. Archaeological evidence has been found of the cultivation of achira in 3000 BCE by people of the Las Vegas culture of coastal Ecuador. As the Las Vegas region is arid and semiarid, achira was not likely a native plant, but imported from more humid climates. Achira was also being cultivated by 2000 BCE by the people of the Casma/Sechin culture in the extremely arid region of coastal Peru, also an area in which achira was probably not native.

=== Field and climate requirements ===
Canna indica requires a growing substrate which is rich, humiferous, and light. The optimal substrate consists of a deep, rich and well-drained soil in a sunny place with a pH between 5.5 and 7.5. The rhizomes are planted at 10 cm deep, after the last frost. Although it can tolerate dry periods, occasional irrigation is beneficial for yield. C. indica is a plant that can withstand low temperatures (down to -10 °C in regions with a mild climate). Nevertheless, the foliage can already be affected at 0 °C.

=== Propagation ===
Canna indica is usually propagated by putting either the rhizome tips or the whole rhizomes in the ground. Because the rhizomes are quickly perishable, storing them properly between the harvest and the next planting time is essential. The large rhizomes can be divided in spring before the new shoots appear. Additionally, Canna indica can also be propagated by seeds. Seedlings growing early in spring are able to flower the same year they are sown.

=== Sowing ===
Farmers using rhizomes for their fields normally sow about 3,000–4,500 kg/ha, and the planting density is recommended to not exceed 22,500 plants/ha. When planting the rhizomes in the ground, the sprouts are placed pointing upwards. The ideal spacing between plants in a row is 60–70 cm (24–28 in), and the spacing between rows is 70–80 cm (28–31 in). Because Canna indica grows quite tall, it is usually cultivated in locations with relatively low wind speed to prevent bending over. Germination begins when the soil temperature is above 16 °C, while the optimal temperature is 20–25 °C. 20–30 days after sowing, seedlings emerge.

=== Fertilization ===
Canna indica is reliant on fertilizer to achieve a good yield. In the early stages, seedling fertilizer is generally applied during the first tillage and spread according to seedling conditions. Up to 750 kg/ha of ternary compound fertilizer (N, P, K) might be applied. When applying fertilizer, direct contact with the base and leaves is avoided. Before flowering, the second tillage might be combined with the second fertilizer application to promote the growth of underground stems and roots. Farmers apply fertilizer evenly on both sides of the roots, which helps them to absorb water and grow uniformly.

=== Weed control ===
Fast growing weeds can have a negative impact on C. indica, especially before the fourth leaf appears. Two weed control methods are usually practiced: firstly, applying herbicides to eradicate weeds and secondly, carrying out mechanical operations depending on the weed growth.

=== Harvest ===
About six months after planting, the crop can be harvested. At this time, the rhizomes are tender and succulent. However, the rhizomes are mainly harvested later, after 8–10 months, when they reach their maximum size. C. indica is suitable as an emergency crop in case of shortfalls due to its long durability in the ground. It can be harvested during times when the cultivation of other crops is not successful.

Harvesting is done manually by pulling out the crop with a shovel or another digging tool, shaking off the soil, and then cutting the stems to separate the rhizomes.

=== Yield ===
The yield varies depending on the region of cultivation and its climate and soil conditions. In certain locations, the yield of Canna indica can be higher than other starchy crops like cassava and arrowroot. The average rhizome yield is believed to be around 22–50 tons per hectare, whereas the starch yield is about 2–5 tons per hectare and can reach up to 10 tons per ha. Observations show that the highest yield in rhizomes does not necessarily correspond to the highest yield in starch.

== Uses ==
=== Culinary ===
The edible rhizomes consist of 73% water. In addition to 24% starch, they still contain 1% protein, 0.6% crude fiber and 1.4% minerals. They can be eaten raw, but are usually baked. Cooked, the rhizomes become translucent, mucilaginous, and sweet.

Starch is produced by grinding or pounding the roots and soaking them in water, separating the starch granules from fibers in the roots. The starch granules of C. indica are also translucent and the largest known from any plant. The starch is occasionally marketed commercially as "arrowroot", a name also applied to the starch of other similar roots crops such as Maranta arundinacea. It was an ingredient in mid-19th-century recipes such as cakes and was called tous-les-mois. The starch is easily digestible and therefore well suited as a health and baby food. The starch is also suitable for baking.

In South America, the leaves are used to wrap pastries (tamales, humitas, quimbolitos, juanes, etc.), similar to banana leaves or maize leaves.

In Colombia, Achira cakes, breads, and cookies are traditional, typical in the south-central part of the country, specifically in the departments of Huila and Tolima.

==== History ====
It (achira in Hispanic America, cana-da-índia in Brazil) has been a minor food crop cultivated by indigenous peoples of the Americas for thousands of years.

The Spanish took notice of achira in 1549 when it was mentioned as one of four root crops being grown for food by the people of the Chuquimayo valley (Jaén province) of Peru. The other three were sweet potato (Ipomoea batatas), cassava (Manihot esculenta), and racacha (Arracacia xanthorrhiza). In 1609, achira was described by a Spanish visitor to Cusco, Peru. In modern times, achira is rarely grown for food, although in the 1960s it was still an important crop in Paruro Province on the upper Apurimac River near Cusco. There, at elevations of up to 2,600 m (8,500 ft), achira is cultivated and harvested, especially to be eaten during the Festival of Corpus Christi in May or June. The rhizomes are wrapped with achira leaves and placed in a pit with heated rocks. The pit is then filled with dirt and the achira is slowly baked underground.

In the 1950s, C. indica was introduced to China as a perennial ornamental crop. It was mainly planted in parks and home gardens in Guizhou for ornamental purposes. From the late 1950s to the early 1960s, China suffered from a severe food shortage. During this time, weeds, tree roots, tubers, etc., became important sources of famine food, which included C. indica and led to its use as a food crop. Today, the rhizomes are processed into starch, vermicelli, white wine, and ethanol. Due to its relatively low disease and pest pressure, it has become a characteristic crop for large-scale cultivation in China. The research in China mainly focuses on processing methods, and additionally, there are few studies on varieties and cultivation techniques.

==== Starch production ====
Rhizomes for starch extraction should be processed within days after the harvest due to their perishability. The process is dependent on a significant supply of fresh water. In rural Colombia, the recently harvested rhizomes are packed up in sacks and transported to the processing site, where they are washed in tanks. The rhizomes are then mechanically grated to disrupt the cell walls to release the starch. They are then manually or mechanically passed through a sieve with water. The starch granules sink to the bottom of a tank. Then, the starch is washed multiple times with clean water. The starch by dried in the sun, readying it for storage or transportation.

=== Other uses ===
In some areas, the leaves are fed to livestock.

The seeds are widely used for jewellery, being pierced in some areas and used as pearls. They are also used as a filling of rattles, such as the kayamb, a musical instrument from Réunion, as well as the hosho, a gourd rattle from Zimbabwe, where the seeds are known as hota seeds. From the Indians, the seeds were previously used as gold weights, similar to the seeds of carob (Ceratonia siliqua), as they have a constant weight. According to the BBC, "during the Indian Mutiny of the 19th century, soldiers used the seeds of a Canna indica when they ran out of bullets."

Canna indica sps. can be used for the treatment of industrial waste waters through constructed wetlands. It is effective for the removal of high organic load, colour and chlorinated organic compounds from paper mill wastewater.

In China, the starch and polyethylene are used as raw materials to produce biodegradable plastics. This type of plastics is affordable and can degrade completely into fertilizer for crop production in just a few months. The method for producing C. indica plastics consists of fusing 60–80% of C. indica starch and 20–40% of polyethylene uniformly at 240 °C.

== See also ==
- List of Canna cultivars
- List of Canna hybridists
- List of Canna species
