= List of Canna species =

Canna species have been categorised by two different taxonomists in the course of the last three decades. They are Paul Maas, from the Netherlands and Nobuyuki Tanaka from Japan. Both reduced the number of species from the 50-100 that had been accepted previously, and assigned most to being synonyms. Inevitably, there are some differences in their categorisations, and the individual articles on the species describe the differences.

The reduction in the number of species is also confirmed by work done by Kress and Prince at the Smithsonian Institution, however, this only covers a subset of the species range.

Tanaka's 2001 Taxonomic revision of the family Cannaceae in the New World and Asia is one source of species names, allied with the proposal to conserve the name Canna tuerckheimii over C. latifolia. The most exhaustive work on Canna synonyms is that in the World Checklist of Selected Plant Families (WCSP).

== List of species ==
The following list is based on the Taxonomic revision of the family Cannaceae in the New World and Asia, by Tanaka and the proposal to conserve the name Canna tuerckheimii over C. latifolia. As of March 2020, the World Checklist of Selected Plant Families and Plants of the World Online regard many of these as synonyms (most of Canna indica) but also recognise two further species, making 12 in total.

- Canna amabilis T.Koyama & Nob.Tanaka = Canna indica
- Canna bangii Kraenzl.
- Canna coccinea Blanc. = Canna indica
- Canna compacta Rosc. = Canna indica
- Canna discolor (Lindl.) Nob.Tanaka = Canna indica
  - Canna discolor var. discolor
  - Canna discolor var. rubripunctata Nob.Tanaka
  - Canna discolor var. viridifolia Nob.Tanaka
- Canna flaccida Salisb.
- Canna glauca L.
  - Canna glauca var. siamensis (Kraenzl) Nob.Tanaka
- Canna indica L.
  - Canna indica var. flava (Roscoe ex Baker) Nob.Tanaka
  - Canna indica var. maculata (Hook) Nob.Tanaka
  - Canna indica var. sanctae-rosae (Kraenzl.) Nob.Tanaka
  - Canna indica var. warszewiczii (A.Dietr.) Nob.Tanaka
- Canna iridiflora Ruiz & Pav.
- Canna jacobiniflora T.Koyama & Nob.Tanaka = Canna glauca
- Canna jaegeriana Urb.
- Canna liliiflora Warsc. ex Planch.
- Canna lineata Ciciar.
- Canna paniculata Ruiz & Pav.
- Canna patens Rosc. = Canna indica
- Canna pedunculata Sims
- Canna plurituberosa T.Koyama & Nob.Tanaka = Canna indica
- Canna speciosa Rosc. = Canna indica
- Canna stenantha Nob.Tanaka = Canna glauca
- Canna tandilensis Ciciar.
- Canna tuerckheimii Kraenzl.

=== Cultivar type names ===
In addition, several species have been given cultivar-type names, and those are listed below:

- Canna 'Bandana of the Everglades
- Canna 'Broad-leaved Canna'
- Canna 'Chinese Canna'
- Canna 'Cinnabar Canna'
- Canna 'Dwarf Texas Canna'
- Canna 'Golden Canna'
- Canna 'Indo-China Canna'
- Canna 'Iris Canna'
- Canna 'Louisiana Canna'
- Canna 'Marabout'
- Canna 'Robert Kemp'
- Canna 'Scarlet Canna'
- Canna 'Texas Canna'
- Canna 'Tiki Torch'
- Canna 'Tiki Tourche'
- Canna 'Yellow Canna'

== See also ==
- List of Canna cultivars
- List of Canna hybridists
