= C. coccinea =

C. coccinea may refer to:

- Canna coccinea, a plant species native of northern Argentina
- Crataegus coccinea, the scarlet hawthorn, a plant species

== Synonyms ==
- Cattleya coccinea, a synonym for Sophronitis coccinea, an orchid species occurring from Brazil to Argentina

== See also ==
- Coccinea (disambiguation)
