= Patens (disambiguation) =

Paten is a plate used in Christian services or rites.

Patens may also refer to:

== Plants ==
- Bulbophyllum patens, a species of orchid
- Canna patens, a plant in the family Cannaceae
- Delphinium patens, a species of larkspur known by the common names zigzag larkspur and spreading larkspur
- Encyclia patens, a species of orchid
- Eucalyptus patens, a eucalyptus tree, also known as yarri, blackbutt, Swan River blackbutt and Western Australia blackbutt
- Hamelia patens, a plant in the coffee family Rubiaceae
- Hedeoma patens, a small herb in the family Lamiaceae, commonly known as oregano chiquito
- Ilex patens, a plant in the family Aquifoliaceae endemic to Malaysia
- Juncus patens, a species of rush known by the common name spreading rush
- Orchis patens, a species of orchid
- Penstemon patens, a species of penstemon known by the common name Lone Pine beardtongue
- Physcomitrella patens, a moss
- Pulsatilla patens, commonly known as Eastern pasqueflower, prairie smoke, prairie crocus or cutleaf anemone
- Salvia patens, a herbaceous perennial, also known as gentian sage or spreading sage
- Spartina patens, a cordgrass, also known as salt marsh hay and saltmeadow cordgrass
- Verticordia patens, a woody shrub of Western Australia

== Animals ==
- Omoglymmius patens, a species of beetle in the family Rhysodidae
- Paratrophon patens, a species of sea snail in the family Muricidae
