= S. coccinea =

S. coccinea may refer to:

- Sarcoscypha coccinea, the scarlet elf cup or scarlet cup, a fungus species found in Africa, Asia, Europe, North America and Australia
- Sophronitis coccinea, an orchid species found from Brazil to Argentina

== See also ==
- Coccinea (disambiguation)
