= Canna amabilis =

Scientific classification
- Kingdom: Plantae
- Clade: Tracheophytes
- Clade: Angiosperms
- Clade: Monocots
- Clade: Commelinids
- Order: Zingiberales
- Family: Cannaceae
- Genus: Canna
- Species: C. amabilis

Binomial name
- Canna amabilis T. Koyama & Nb. Tanaka

Species of flowering plant

Canna amabilis is a species of herb in the family Cannaceae. It is native to Northern Argentina (Chaco Province).

It is a perennial and is hardy to zone 10 and is frost tender. In the north latitudes it is in flower from August to October, and the seeds ripen in October. The flowers are hermaphrodite.

== See also ==
- Canna
- List of Canna species
- List of Canna cultivars
