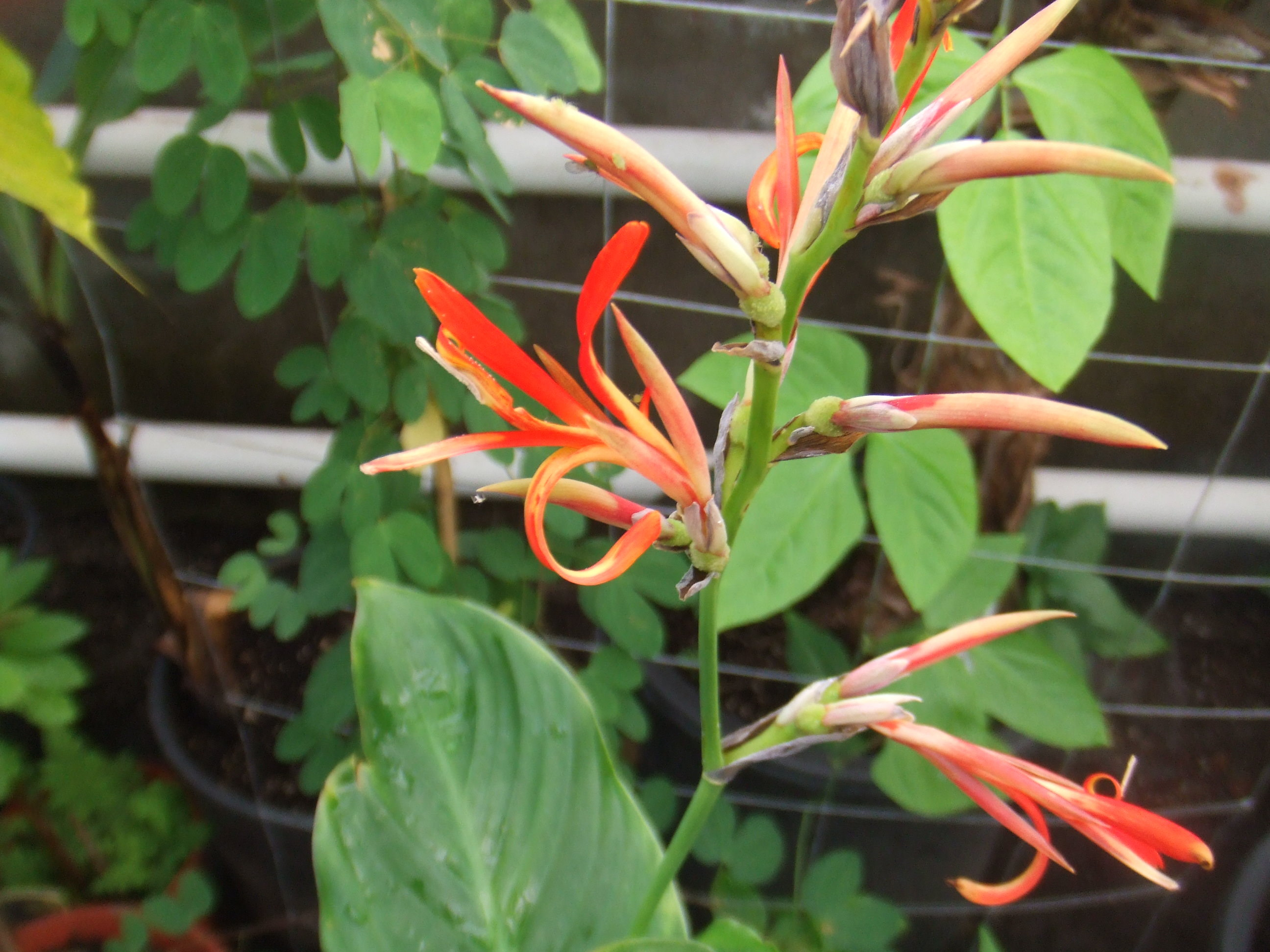

Scientific classification
- Kingdom: Plantae
- Clade: Tracheophytes
- Clade: Angiosperms
- Clade: Monocots
- Clade: Commelinids
- Order: Zingiberales
- Family: Cannaceae
- Genus: Canna
- Species: C. paniculata

Binomial name
- Canna paniculata Ruiz & Pav.

Synonyms
- Canna amambayensis Kraenzl.; Canna confusa J.W.Richardson & L.B.Sm.; Canna denudata Roscoe; Canna denudata var. major Roscoe; Canna excelsa G.Lodd.; Canna jacquinii Bouché; Canna kunzei (Bouché) Kraenzl.; Canna linkii Bouché; Canna meridensis Kraenzl.; Canna miniata Bouché; Canna neglecta Steud.; Canna ottonis (Bouché) Kraenzl.; Canna paniculata var. glabra Regel; Canna tubiflora Regel; Distemon jacquinii (Bouché) Bouché; Distemon kunzei Bouché; Distemon linkii (Bouché) Bouché; Distemon miniatus (Bouché) Bouché; Distemon ottonis Bouché; Distemon roscoeanus Bouché

= Canna paniculata =

Species of flowering plant

Canna paniculata is a species of flowering plant in the family Cannaceae. It is native of southern Mexico, Costa Rica, and tropical South America, except for the Amazon Basin, at 200-2,000m (650-6,500 ft).

It is a perennial growing to 5 m (16 ft) tall. It is hardy to zone 10 and is frost tender. In the north latitudes it is in flower from August to October, and the seeds ripen in October. The flowers are hermaphrodite.

In addition to the above generally agreed synonyms, there is a major reference (1) to Canna 'Musaefolia', admitting that it was earlier called C. excelsa Lodd., but renamed in France by Monsieur Theodoré Anneé because of its resemblance to Musa.

== Taxonomy ==
In the last three decades of the 20th century, Canna species have been categorised by two different taxonomists, Paulus Johannes Maria Maas from the Netherlands and Nobuyuki Tanaka from Japan, and they are in agreement that this is a distinct and separate species.

Canna paniculata grows to 5 m (16 ft) tall. Leaves green, sessile or shortly but distinctly petiolate, petiole with pulvinus, lower side, lower side of leaves mostly lanuginose. Inflorescence often branched. Flowers erect, red to yellow or scarlet, 6–10 cm (2½-4in) long, composed of 6 coloured parts of about equal length; petals not reflexed; staminode one.
