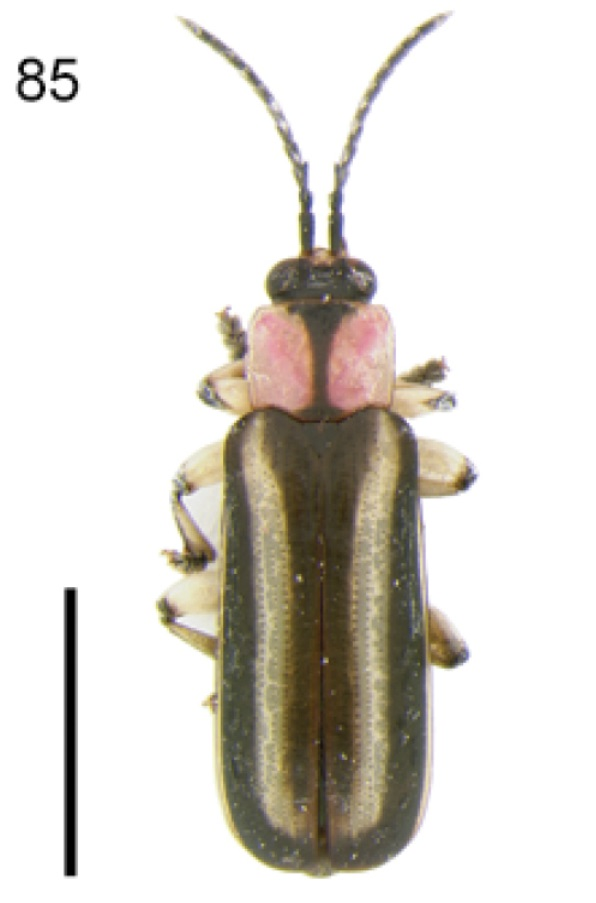

Scientific classification
- Kingdom: Animalia
- Phylum: Arthropoda
- Class: Insecta
- Order: Coleoptera
- Suborder: Polyphaga
- Infraorder: Cucujiformia
- Family: Chrysomelidae
- Genus: Cephaloleia
- Species: C. belti

Binomial name
- Cephaloleia belti Baly, 1885

Synonyms
- Cephaloleia consanguinea Strong, 1977

= Cephaloleia belti =

Species of beetle

Cephaloleia belti is a species of beetle of the family Chrysomelidae. It is found in Costa Rica, Guatemala, Honduras, Mexico, Nicaragua and Panama.

== Description ==
Adults reach a length of about 6.4–6.56 mm. The head, antennae, and scutellum are black, while the pronotum is yellowish with a medial black vitta. The elytron is black from suture to puncture row 2, then yellow through puncture row 5, then black through puncture row 9, puncture row 10 to the margin is yellow.

== Biology ==
They feed on Calathea insignis, Heliconia imbricata, Heliconia latispatha, Heliconia pogonantha, Heliconia mariae, Heliconia tortuosa, Calathea latifolia, Cephaloleia lutea, Heliconia catheta, Heliconia irrasa, Heliconia vaginalis, Heliconia wagneriana, Heliconia mathiasiae, Cephaloleia cleistantha, Cephaloleia crotalifera, Cephaloleia marantifolia, Cephaloleia similis, Canna tuerckheimii, Costus barbatus, Goeppertia lasiophylla, Heliconia denielsiana, Heliconia densiflora, Heliconia longiflora, Heliconia rostrata, Heliconia stricta, Musa paradisiaca, Heliconia psittacorum, Heliconia sarapiquensis, Musa velutina, Ischnosiphon inflatus and Pleiostachya pruinosa.
