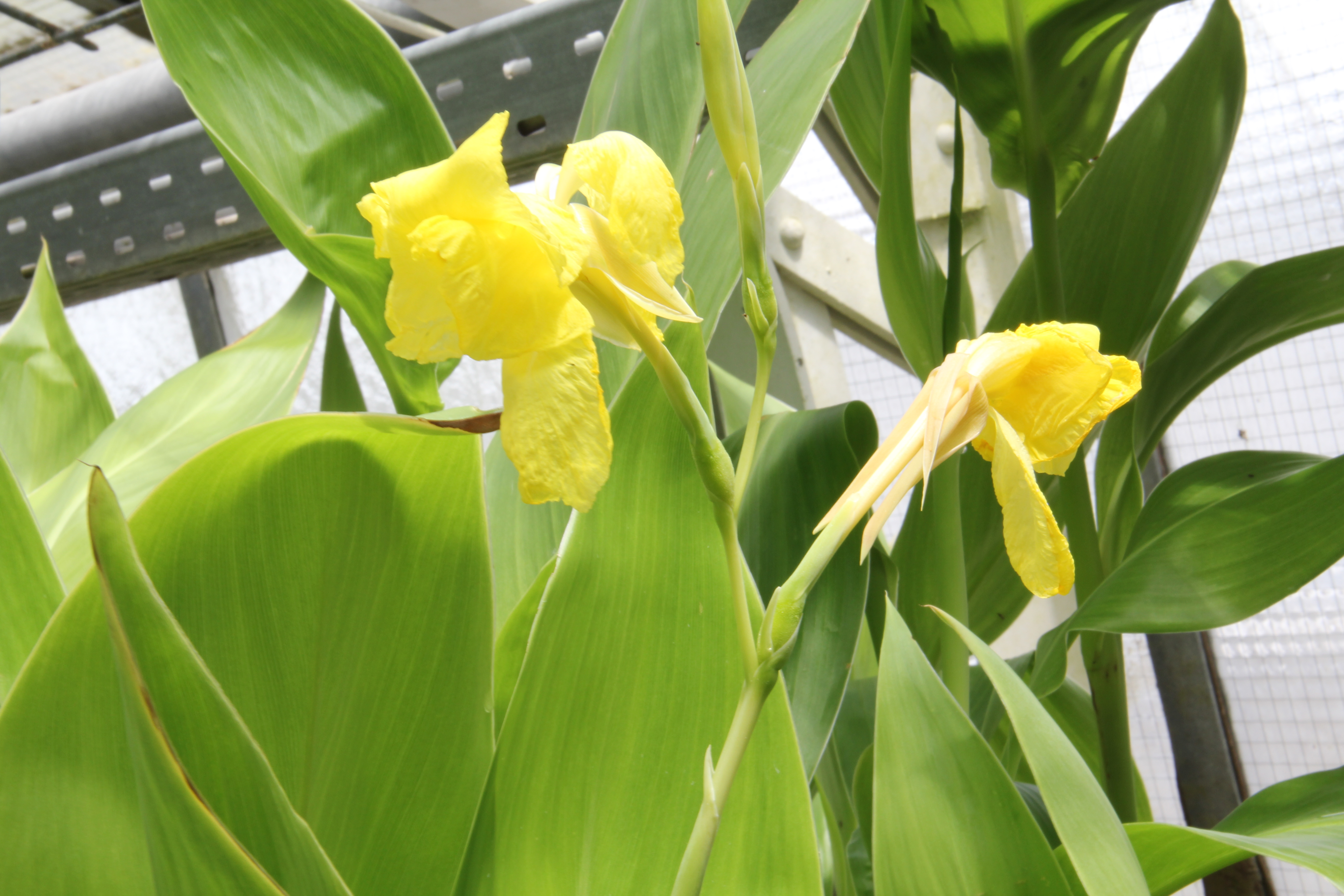
- Canna flaccida, only yellow, lightly perfumed canna.

Scientific classification
- Kingdom: Plantae
- Clade: Tracheophytes
- Clade: Angiosperms
- Clade: Monocots
- Clade: Commelinids
- Order: Zingiberales
- Family: Cannaceae
- Genus: Canna
- Species: C. flaccida

Binomial name
- Canna flaccida Salisb.

Synonyms
- Canna anahuacensis Kraenzl.; Canna angustifolia L.; Canna fintelmannii Bouché; Canna flaccida Roscoe; Canna flava Michx. ex Lam.; Canna reevesii Lindl.

= Canna flaccida =

Bandana-of-the-everglades

Species of flowering plant

Canna flaccida, sometimes referred to as the bandanna of the Everglades, is a species of the Canna genus, a member of the family Cannaceae. The species is indigenous to the wetlands of the south-central and south-eastern United States from Texas to South Carolina. It is also reportedly naturalized in India, the Philippines, Mexico, Panama, Cuba, the Dominican Republic, Peru and southern Brazil.

Canna flaccida was a parent to many of the early-hybridised cannas originally known as orchid flowered cannas, but now correctly named as Italian Group cannas. It grows well as a water canna. Originally described by the early American explorer, William Bartram, when he found these plants blooming near the rivers of coastal Georgia. The seed floats down the rivers and becomes easily established on shorelines. Introduced to England in 1788.

Canna flaccida is a perennial growing to 1.5 m (4 ft 11 in). It is hardy to zone 10 and is frost tender. In the north latitudes it is in flower from August to October, and the seeds ripen in October. The flowers are hermaphrodite.

== Taxonomy ==
In the last three decades of the 20th century, Canna species have been categorised by two different taxonomists, Paulus Johannes Maria Maas from the Netherlands and Nobuyuki Tanaka from Japan. In this case both agree that C. flaccida is a distinct species, and the DNA work by Prince and Kress at the Smithsonian Institution confirms its uniqueness.

== Description ==
Canna flaccida is an aquatic species, with narrow, blue-green (glaucous) leaves, and large, lightly perfumed, canary yellow flowers growing in clusters at the tops of long stalks. The lip of the flower is wavy. Flowers emerge in the evening and wither in the heat of the following day, the only member of the genus that behaves in this manner; all others open early in the morning and are strong enough to survive at least one day. It grows as a marginal plant in up to about 15 cm (5.9 in) of still or slow-moving water.

== See also ==
- Canna
- List of Canna species
- List of Canna cultivars
