= Canna 'Musaefolia' =

Flowering plant cultivar

Canna 'Musaefolia' is a cultivar in to the Foliage Group of Cannas. The cultivar was first described in the first work devoted to Canna, Le Canna, authored by M. Chaté in 1867 with Monsieur Théodore Année. The Musaefolia members of the Foliage Group consist of a specimen that was accepted as a native species of Peru by the experts of the time and at least 7 hybrids and cultivars carrying that parentage. The original "species" was unique because it was without rhizomes, and required to be kept constantly growing. No such species is known to exist in this age, and leading authorities treat C. musaefolia as a synonym of C. paniculata.

== Synonyms ==
- Canna 'Musafolia'
- Canna 'Musifolia'

== Origin ==
Monsieur Chaté writes, "This species was formerly described in the English, Dutch, and German horticultural journals under the name of C. excelsa. It was named musæfolia by Monsieur Théodore Année, who introduced it into France in 1858, from the resemblance of its leaves to those of the Musa or banana-tree. It reaches a height of more than 8 ft (2.4 m) and has green, downy stems, and very large, oval, green leaves. Flowers small, orange-yellow. It is a tender species without rhizomes, and requires to be kept constantly growing. Peru."

Nowadays, Canna excelsa is accepted as a synonym of C. paniculata. However, all currently known Cannas have rhizomes or tubers.

== Hybrids ==
We do know that the early hybridizers, led by Monsieur Année, crossed the original import and produced cultivars, some of which still live on.

=== Canna 'Musaefolia Hybrida' ===
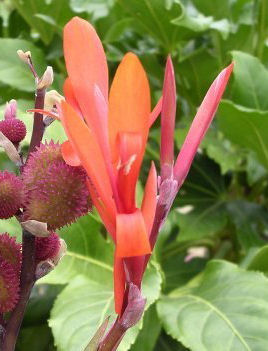
Canna (Foliage Group) 'Musaefolia Hybrida

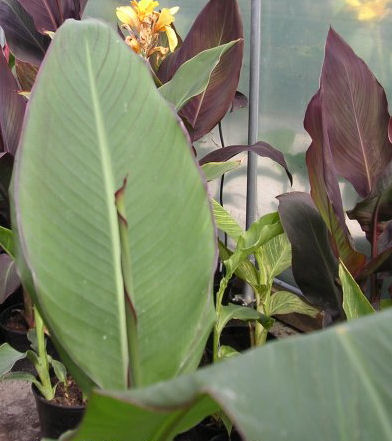
Canna (Foliage Group) 'Musaefolia Hybrida

"Resembles C. 'Musaefolia', but the stems and leaves are thicker and of a deeper green."

A tall Foliage Group cultivar; dark green foliage, very large, broadly oblong shaped, maroon margin, spreading habit; oval stems, coloured green; flowers are upright, self-coloured salmon-red, staminodes are small, edges regular, style is red, petals purple with farina, fully self-cleaning; fertile both ways, not true to type, self-pollinating, capsules round; rhizomes are thick, up to 3 cm in diameter, coloured purple; tillering is prolific. Introduced by Théodore Année, Passy, France in 1860.

=== Canna 'Musaefolia Minima' ===
"Leaves of a whitish green, badly set. Flowers small, orange brown. No rootstocks. Introduced by Théodore Année, Passy, France, EU in 1860."

As all Canna grown today have rhizomes or tubers, this hybrid must now be considered to be extinct.

=== Canna 'Musaefolia Peruviana' ===
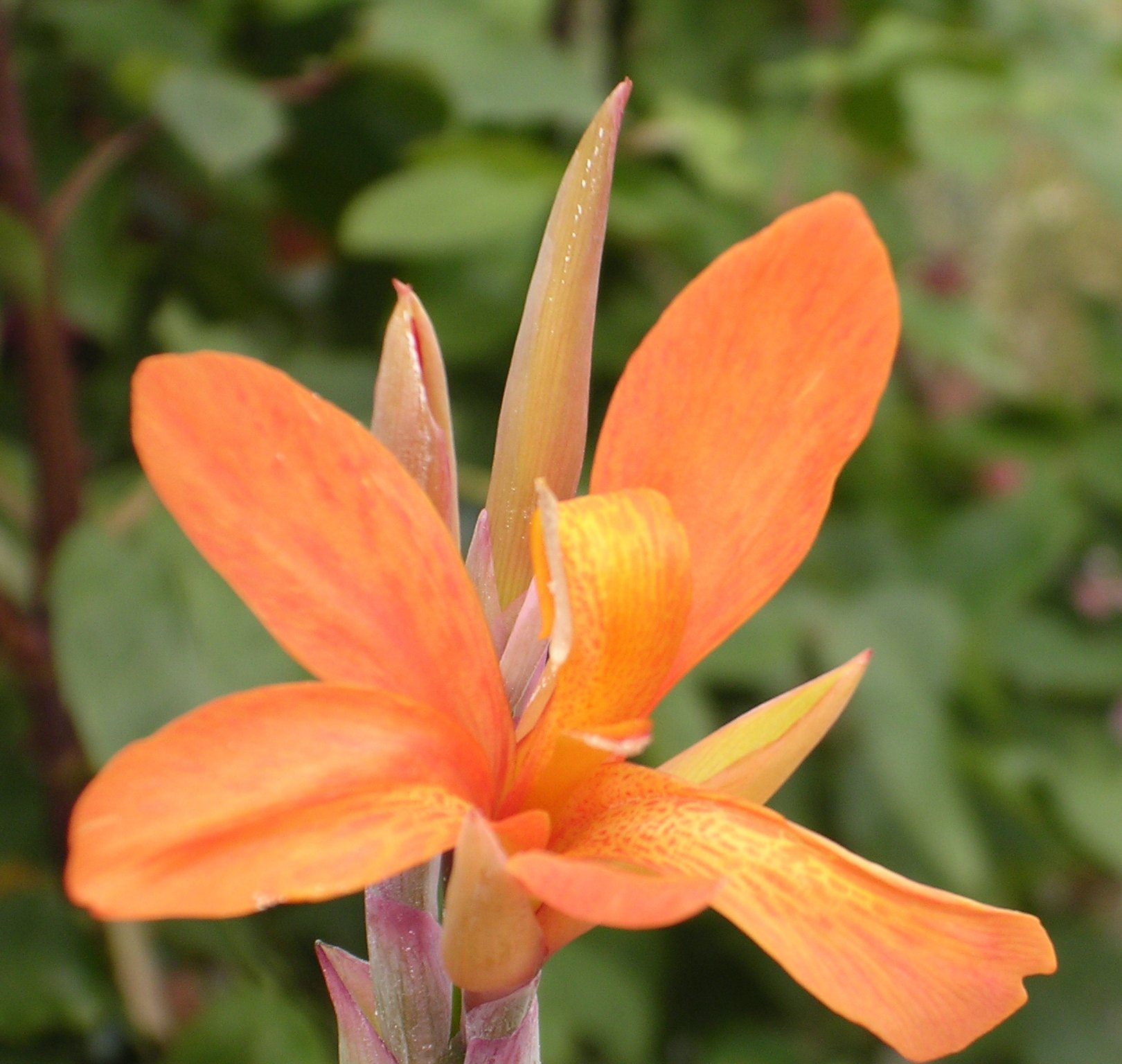
Canna (Foliage Group) 'Musaefolia Peruviana

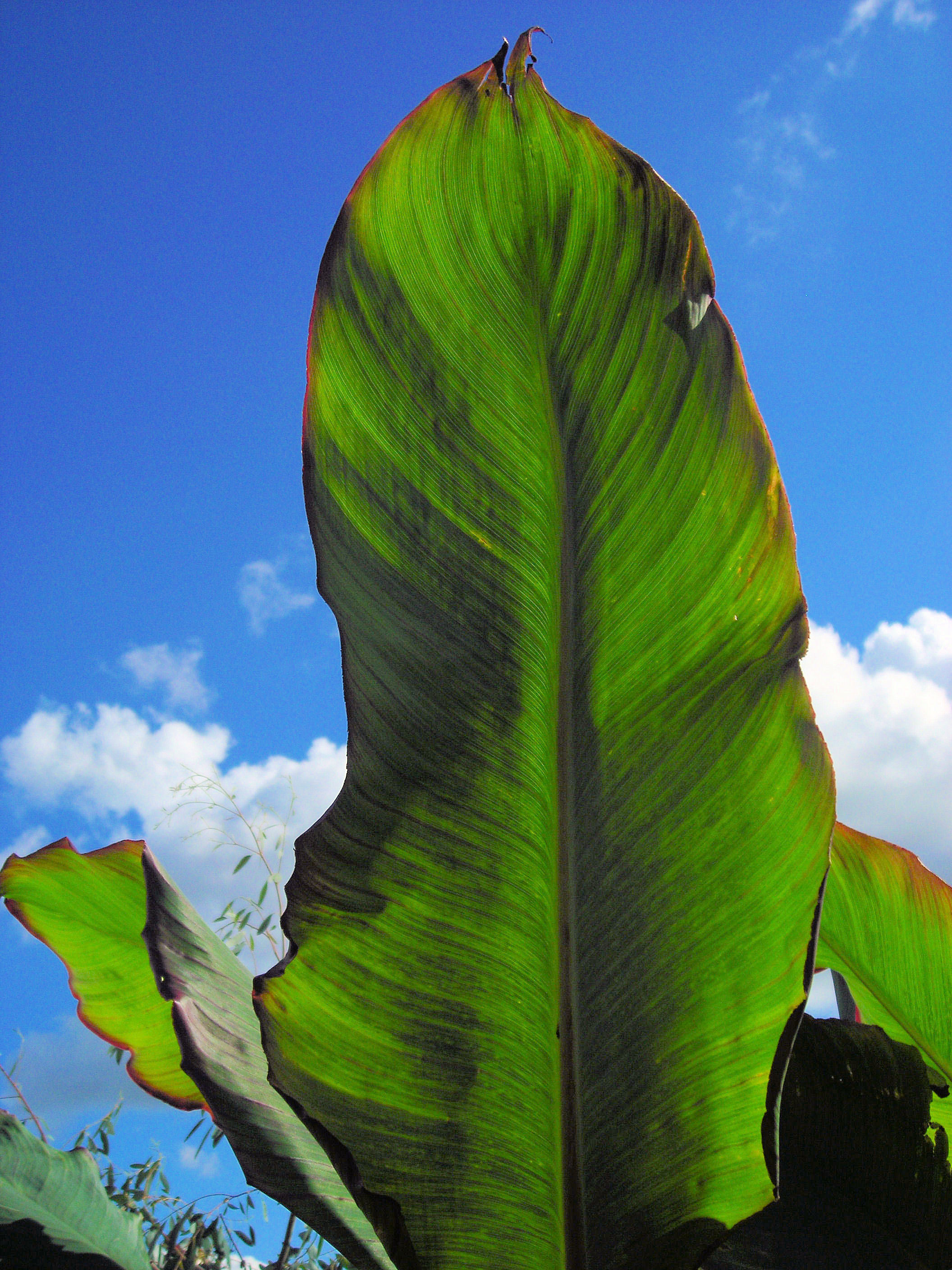
Canna (Foliage Group) 'Musaefolia Peruviana

"Stems green and downy, 5 ft. to 6½ ft. high. Leaves very large, wide, green. Flowers small, orange. Rootstocks very small. Introduced by E. Chaté et fils, sentier Saint-Antoine, Saint-Mandé, Paris, France, EU. in 1862."

A tall Foliage Group cultivar; green foliage, very large, broadly oblong shaped, maroon margin, spreading habit; oval stems, coloured green; spikes of flowers are open, red-orange with orange-red spots, staminodes are medium size, edges regular, labellum is gold flecked, stamen is gold with orange markings, style is orange, petals yellow, fully self-cleaning; fertile both ways, not true to type, self-pollinating, capsules round; rhizomes are thick, up to 3 cm in diameter, coloured pink and purple; tillering is prolific.

This does not normally flower in northern climates, but if kept growing over the winter in a heated greenhouse or conservatory it will happily bloom either in late spring or late summer.

=== Canna 'Musaefolia Perfecta' ===
"Stems from 5 ft. to 6½ ft. high. Leaves broad, very firm, of a whiteish green. Flowers small, yellow. Roots fiberous, without rootstocks. Introduced by Théodore Année, Passy, France, EU in 1862."

The description above states that it is without rhizomes. No such Canna rhizome challenged cultivar currently exists and therefore this must be considered extinct.

=== Canna 'Musaefolia Rubra' ===
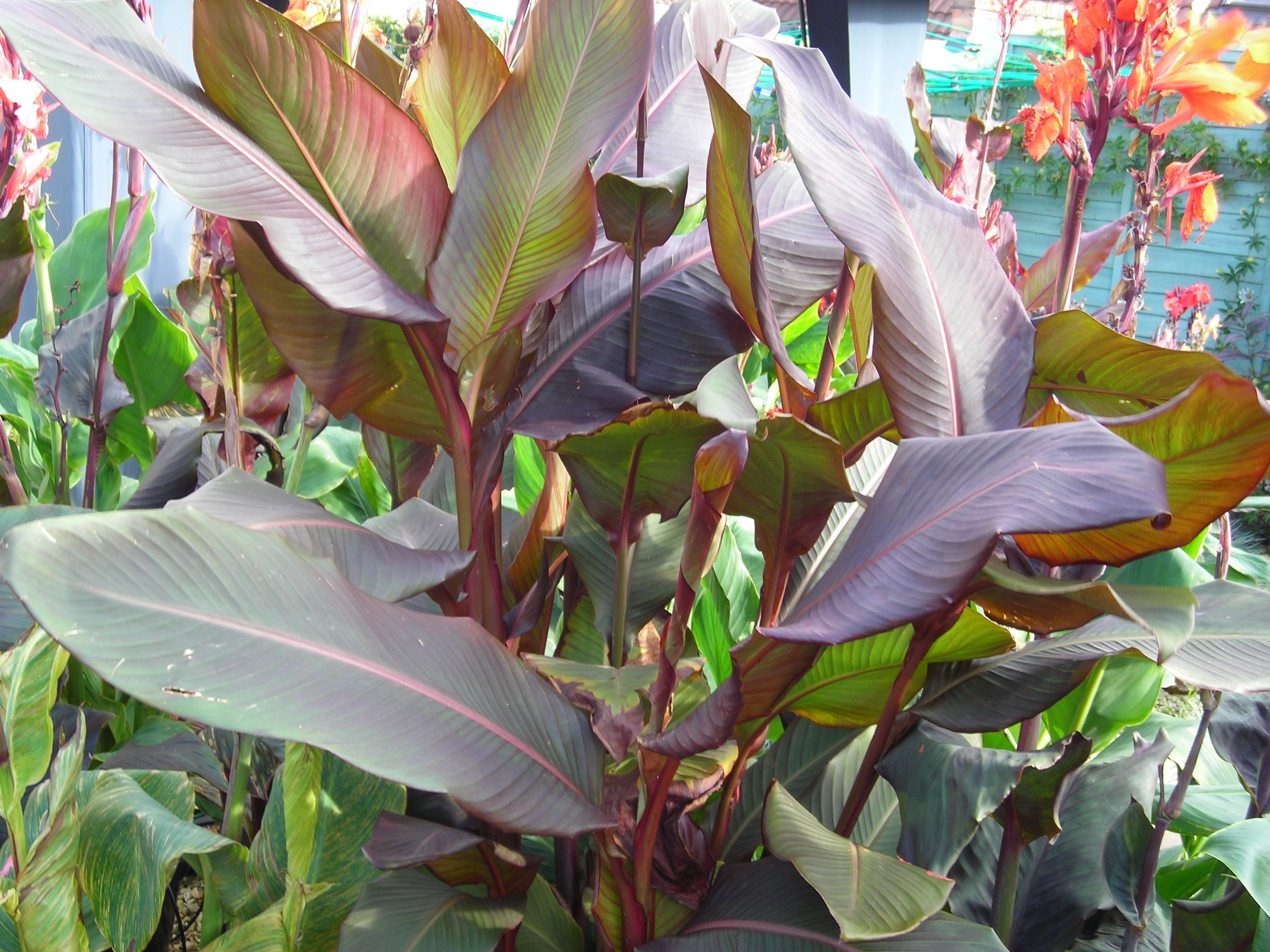
Canna (Foliage Group) 'Musaefolia Rubra'

"Stems dark red, 6½ ft. high. Leaves dark purple-red, oval, very large. Flowers small, salmon-red. Rootstocks very tender, with fibrous roots. Introduced by Théodore Année, Passy, France, EU in 1862."

A tall Foliage Group cultivar; dark green foliage, very large, broadly oblong shaped, maroon margin, spreading habit; oval stems, coloured green; flowers are upright, self-coloured salmon-red, staminodes are small, edges regular, style is red, petals purple with farina, fully self-cleaning; fertile both ways, not true to type, self-pollinating, capsules round; rhizomes are thick, up to 3 cm in diameter, coloured purple; tillering is prolific.

=== Canna 'Musaefolia Grande' ===
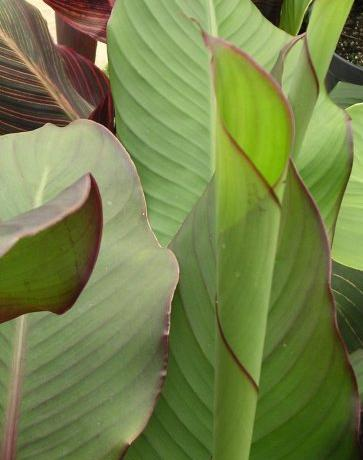
Canna (Foliage Group) Canna 'Musaefolia Grande'

The original five musaefolia hybrids have been recently joined by this cultivar, which may be a synonym of one of the five above, or a new hybrid. It is regarded by many enthusiasts as a magnificent specimen and is becoming increasingly popular.

A giant Foliage Group cultivar; green and purple variegated foliage, large, oval shaped, maroon margin, branching habit; half-round stems, coloured green + purple; spikes of flowers are upright, self-coloured orange-red, staminodes are long and narrow, fully self-cleaning; fertile both ways, not true to type, self-pollinating, capsules globose; rhizomes are thick, up to 7 cm in diameter, coloured purple; tillering is prolific. Introduced by Herb Kelly, USA, from Venezuela.

The earliest reference to this is the catalogue of Kelly's Plant World, California, USA. 1989.

== See also ==
- Canna
- List of Canna species
- List of Canna cultivars
- List of Canna hybridists
