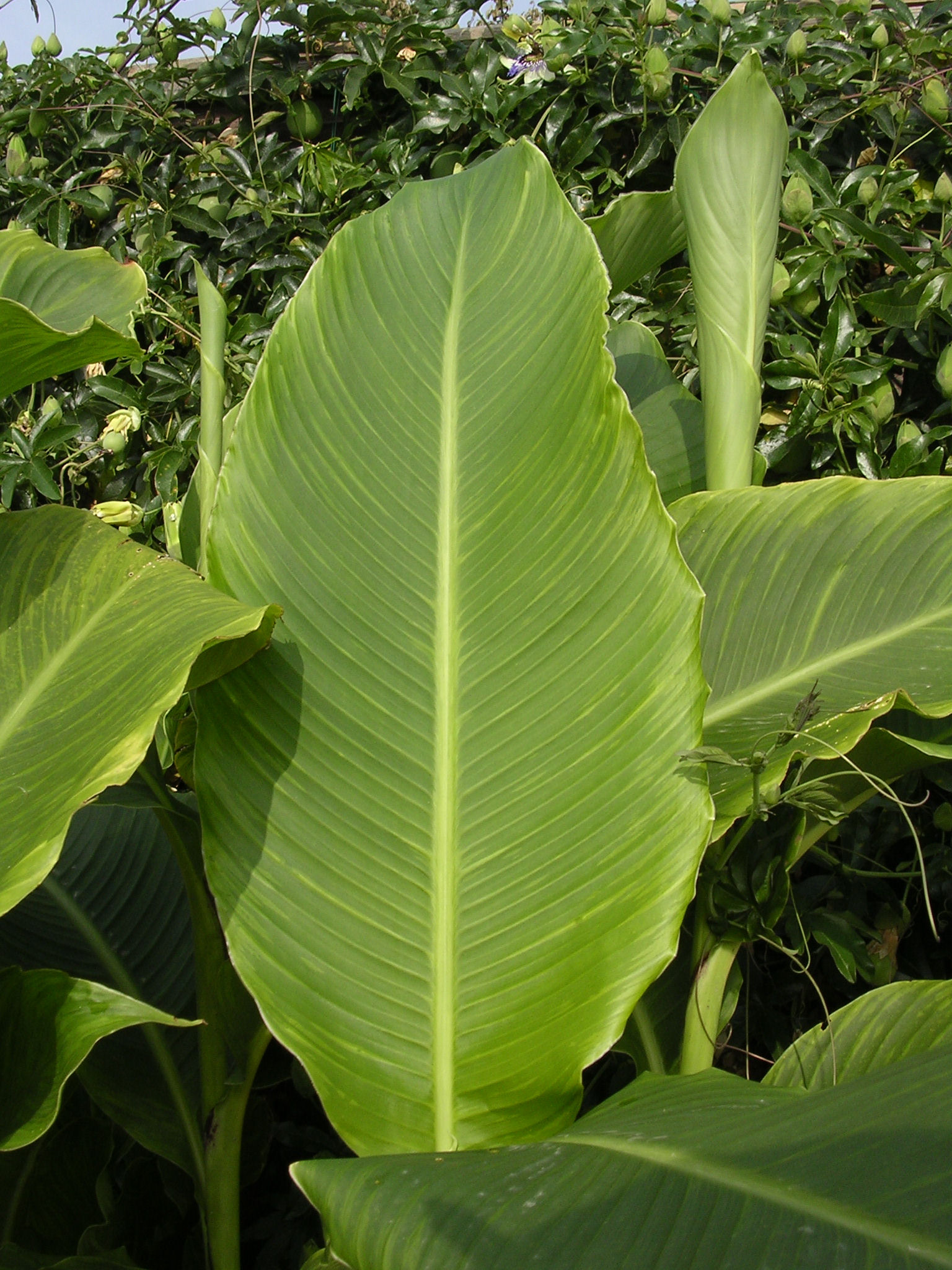
- Leaf form

Scientific classification
- Kingdom: Plantae
- Clade: Tracheophytes
- Clade: Angiosperms
- Clade: Monocots
- Clade: Commelinids
- Order: Zingiberales
- Family: Cannaceae
- Genus: Canna
- Species: C. tuerckheimii

Binomial name
- Canna tuerckheimii Kraenzl.

Synonyms
- Canna altensteinii Bouché; Canna coccinea var. sylvestris (Roscoe) Regel; Canna curviflora Horan.; Canna gemella Nees & Mart.; Canna gigantea F. Delaroche; Canna iridiflora Willd.; Canna latifolia Mill.; Canna macrophylla Hort. ex Horan.; Canna neglecta Weinm.; Canna sylvestris Roscoe; Canna violacea Bouché; Palo de Sol (en México)

= Canna tuerckheimii =

Species of flowering plant

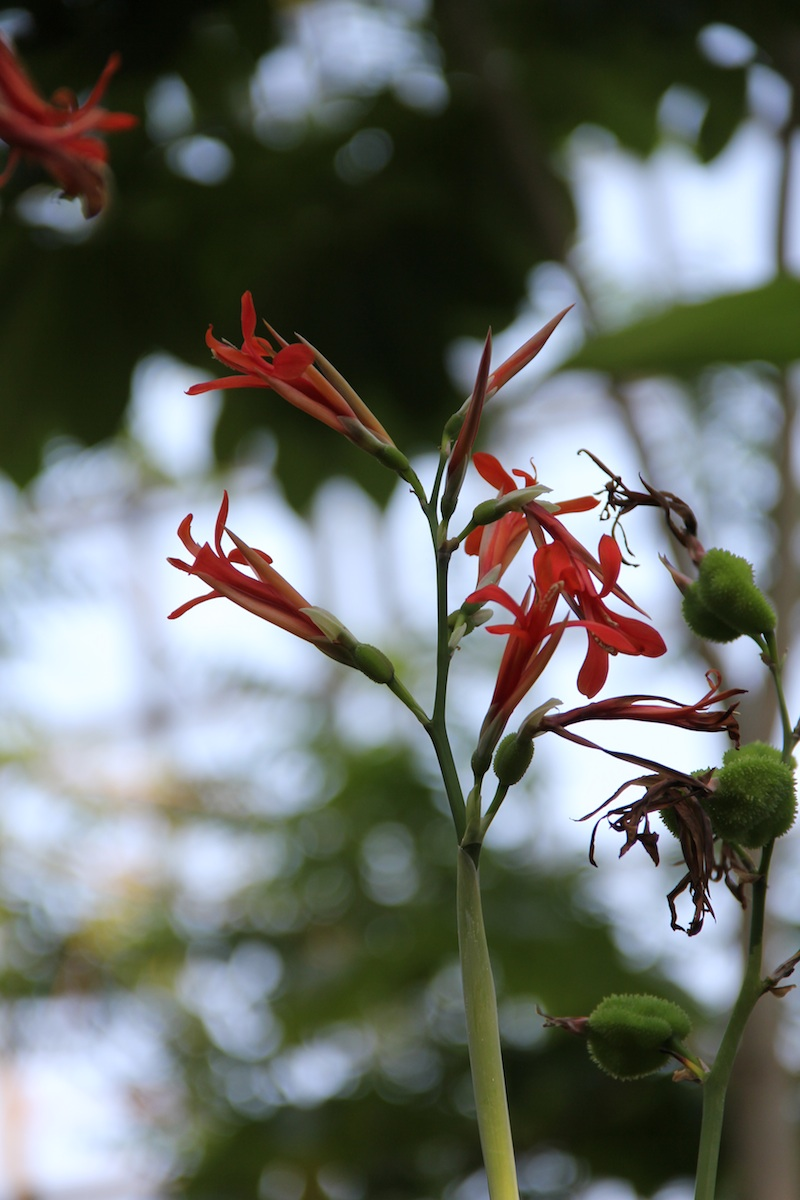
Flowers

Canna tuerckheimii is a species of the Canna genus, belonging to the family Cannaceae. Its specific epithet tuerckheimii commemorates Hans von Türckheim, a 19th-century German plant collector.

== Description ==
Herb up to 5 m tall. Canna tuerckheimii is a relatively large species with vast stems carrying large green leaves and high carried orange-red flowers. Stems of up to 3–3.5 m (11½ ft) in height. Green leaves, relatively large, 30–100 cm x 15–40 cm (12–36 in x 6–16 in), lower side and sheaths lanuginose. Flowers are erect orange-red, 5.5–9 cm (2¼–3½in) long; floral tube not curved, composed of nine coloured parts; petals not reflexed; with four staminodes.

== Distribution ==
Canna tuerckheimii is native to Belize, Costa Rica, Guatemala, Honduras, Mexico, Nicaragua, Panama, Colombia and Ecuador at 500–2,000 m (1,600–6,600 ft) of elevation.

== Taxonomy ==
Paulus Johannes Maria Maas and Nobuyuki Tanaka, both experts on the genus Canna, disagree on the correct taxonomic placement of this species, with Tanaka considering the correct placement for the species to be C. latifolia.

== Cultivation ==
It is hardy to zone 10 and is frost tender. In the north latitudes, it is in flower from August to October, and the early seeds ripen in October.

== See also ==
- List of Canna species
- List of Canna cultivars
