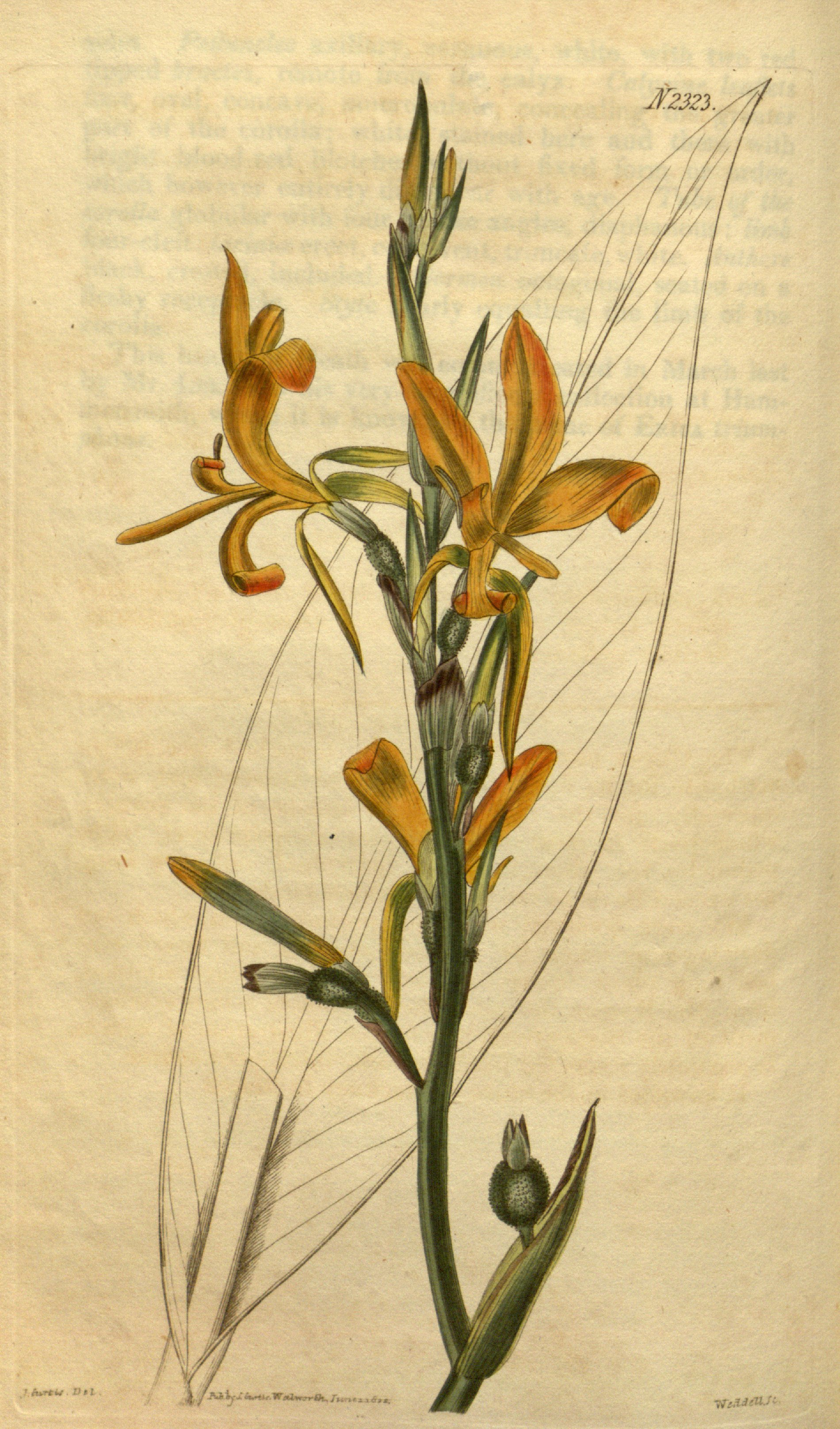

Scientific classification
- Kingdom: Plantae
- Clade: Tracheophytes
- Clade: Angiosperms
- Clade: Monocots
- Clade: Commelinids
- Order: Zingiberales
- Family: Cannaceae
- Genus: Canna
- Species: C. pedunculata

Binomial name
- Canna pedunculata Sims

= Canna pedunculata =

Species of flowering plant

Canna pedunculata is a species of the Canna genus, belonging to the family Cannaceae. Native of south-east Brazil at low altitudes. Johnson's Dictionary of 1856 reports that it first entered England in 1820, pedunculata meaning 'long-flower-stalked'.

It is a perennial growing to 2.5 m (8 ft) tall. It is hardy to zone 10 and is frost tender. In the north latitudes it is in flower from August to October, and the seeds ripen in October. The flowers are hermaphrodite.

== Synonyms ==
- Canna buekii Weinm.
- Canna reflexa Nees ex D.Dietr.

== Taxonomy ==
In the last three decades of the 20th century, Canna species have been categorised by two different taxonomists, Paulus Johannes Maria Maas from the Netherlands and Nobuyuki Tanaka from Japan. The two taxonomists are in agreement that this is a separate and distinct species.

== Canna pedunculata Sims ==
Grows to 2.5m tall, leaves are green, glaucous and relatively narrow (4–13 cm/1½-5 inches wide). The flowers are erect, yellow, relatively small (3–4 cm/1¼-1½inches long), composed of 9 coloured parts; sepals obtuse; petals reflexed; 4 staminodes, narrow (2-10mm/¼-½inch wide).
