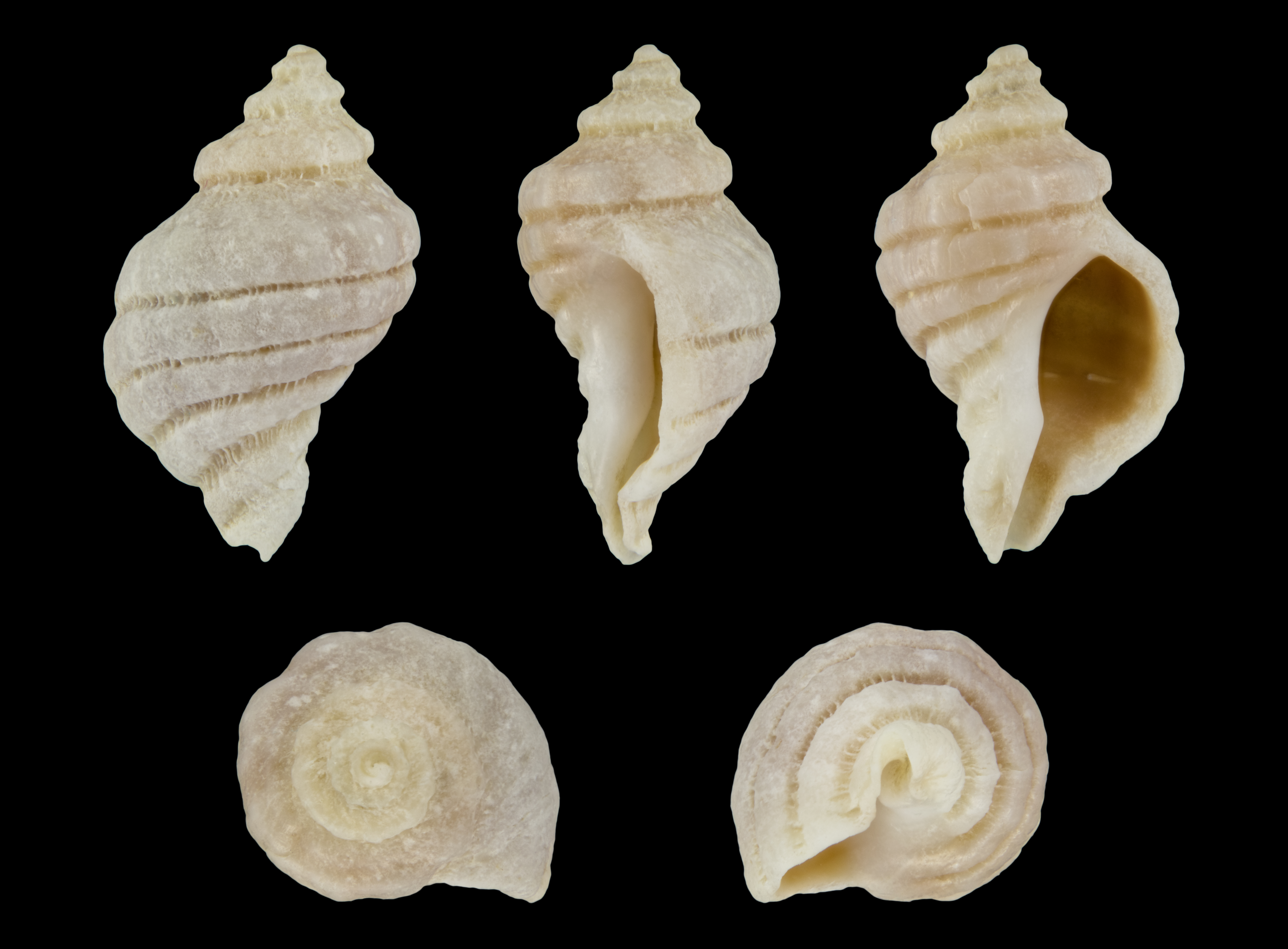

Scientific classification
- Kingdom: Animalia
- Phylum: Mollusca
- Class: Gastropoda
- Subclass: Caenogastropoda
- Order: Neogastropoda
- Family: Muricidae
- Genus: Paratrophon
- Species: P. cheesemani

Binomial name
- Paratrophon cheesemani (Hutton, 1882)

Synonyms
- Paratrophon cheesemani cheesemani (Hutton, 1882); Paratrophon cheesemani exsculptus Powell, 1933; Paratrophon cheesmani [sic] (misspelling); Paratrophon exsculptus Powell,1933; Polytropa cheesemani Hutton, 1882

= Paratrophon cheesemani =

Species of gastropod

Paratrophon cheesemani is a species of sea snail, a marine gastropod mollusk in the family Muricidae, the murex snails or rock snails.

== Distribution ==
This marine species is endemic to New Zealand.
