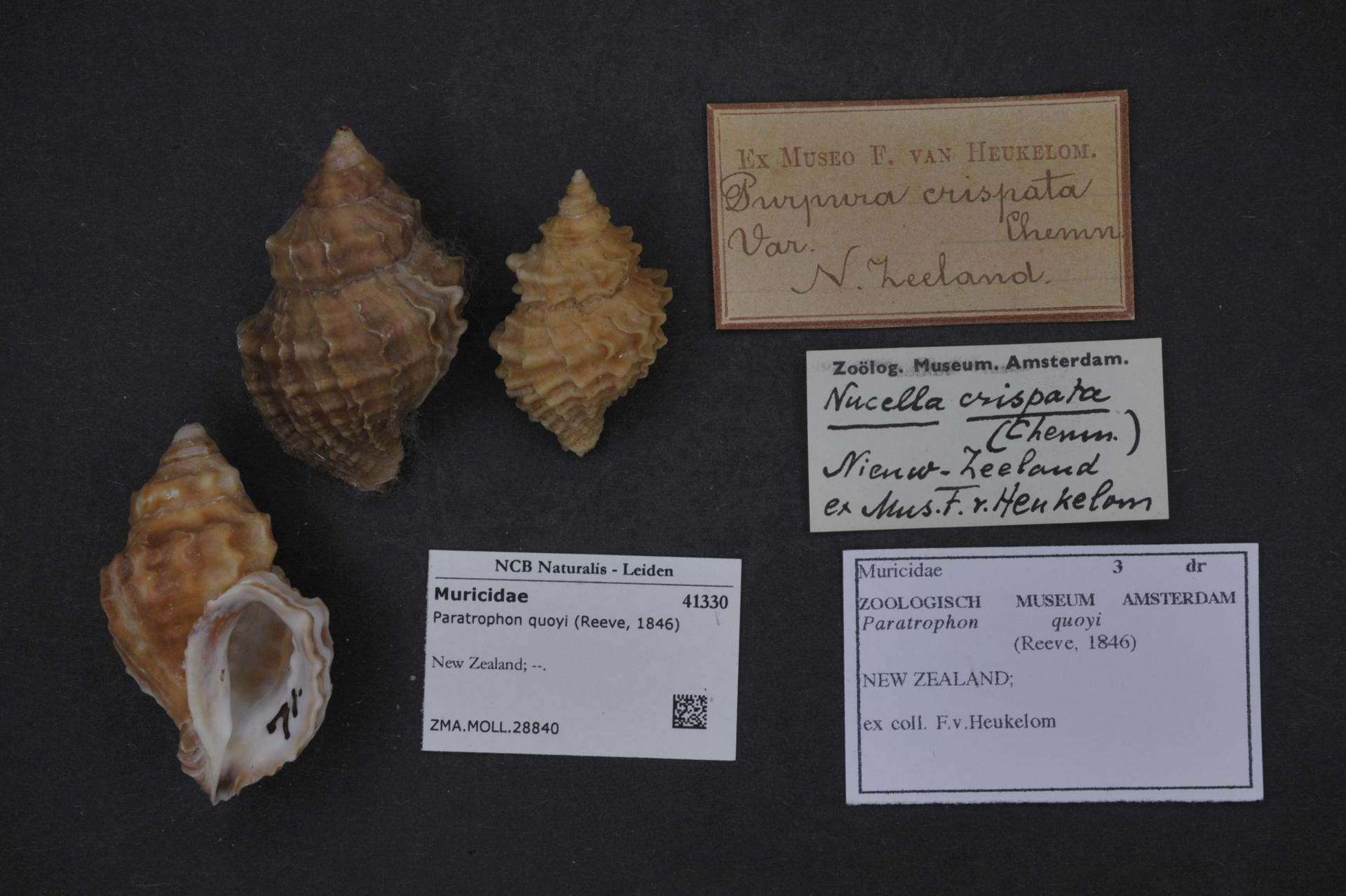
- Sample of Paratrophon quoyi

Scientific classification
- Kingdom: Animalia
- Phylum: Mollusca
- Class: Gastropoda
- Subclass: Caenogastropoda
- Order: Neogastropoda
- Family: Muricidae
- Genus: Paratrophon
- Species: P. quoyi

Binomial name
- Paratrophon quoyi (Reeve, 1846)

Synonyms
- Polytropa retiara Hutton, 1878; Purpura quoyi Reeve, 1846

= Paratrophon quoyi =

Species of gastropod

Paratrophon quoyi is a species of sea snail, a marine gastropod mollusc in the family Muricidae, the murex snails or rock snails.

== Description ==
These marine snails are small, being about 14 mm in length. Their shells are pinkish in color and spiralled. See for photos.

== Distribution ==
Paratrophon quoyi are found in waters off New South Wales in Australia and the North Island in New Zealand. They live on rocks in the intertidal zone. They feed on algae during high tide. During low tide, they shut themselves up tight to prevent water loss.
