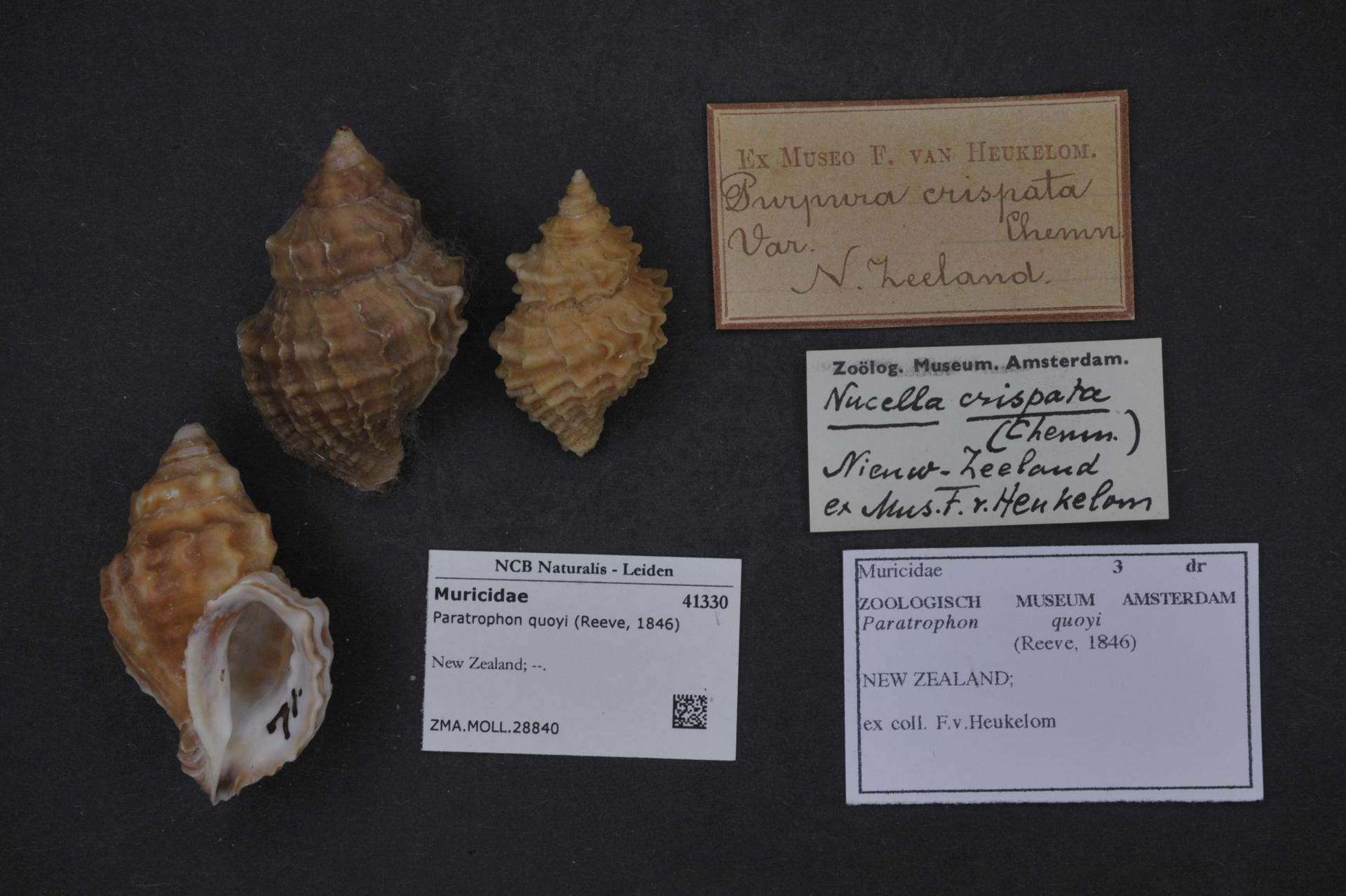
- Paratrophon quoyi

Scientific classification
- Kingdom: Animalia
- Phylum: Mollusca
- Class: Gastropoda
- Subclass: Caenogastropoda
- Order: Neogastropoda
- Superfamily: Muricoidea
- Family: Muricidae
- Subfamily: Pagodulinae
- Genus: Paratrophon; Finlay, 1926

Type species
- Polytropa cheesemani Hutton, 1882

= Paratrophon =

Genus of gastropods

Paratrophon is a genus of sea snails, marine gastropod mollusks in the subfamily Pagodulinae of the family Muricidae, the murex snails or rock snails.

== Species ==
Species within the genus Paratrophon include:

- Paratrophon cheesemani (Hutton, 1882)
- Paratrophon dumasi (Vélain, 1877)
- Paratrophon patens (Hombron & Jacquinot, 1854)
- Paratrophon quoyi (Reeve, 1846)

Species brought into synonymy

- Paratrophon cheesmani [sic]: synonym of Paratrophon cheesemani (Hutton, 1882)
- Paratrophon exsculptus Powell, 1933: synonym of Paratrophon cheesemani (Hutton, 1882)
