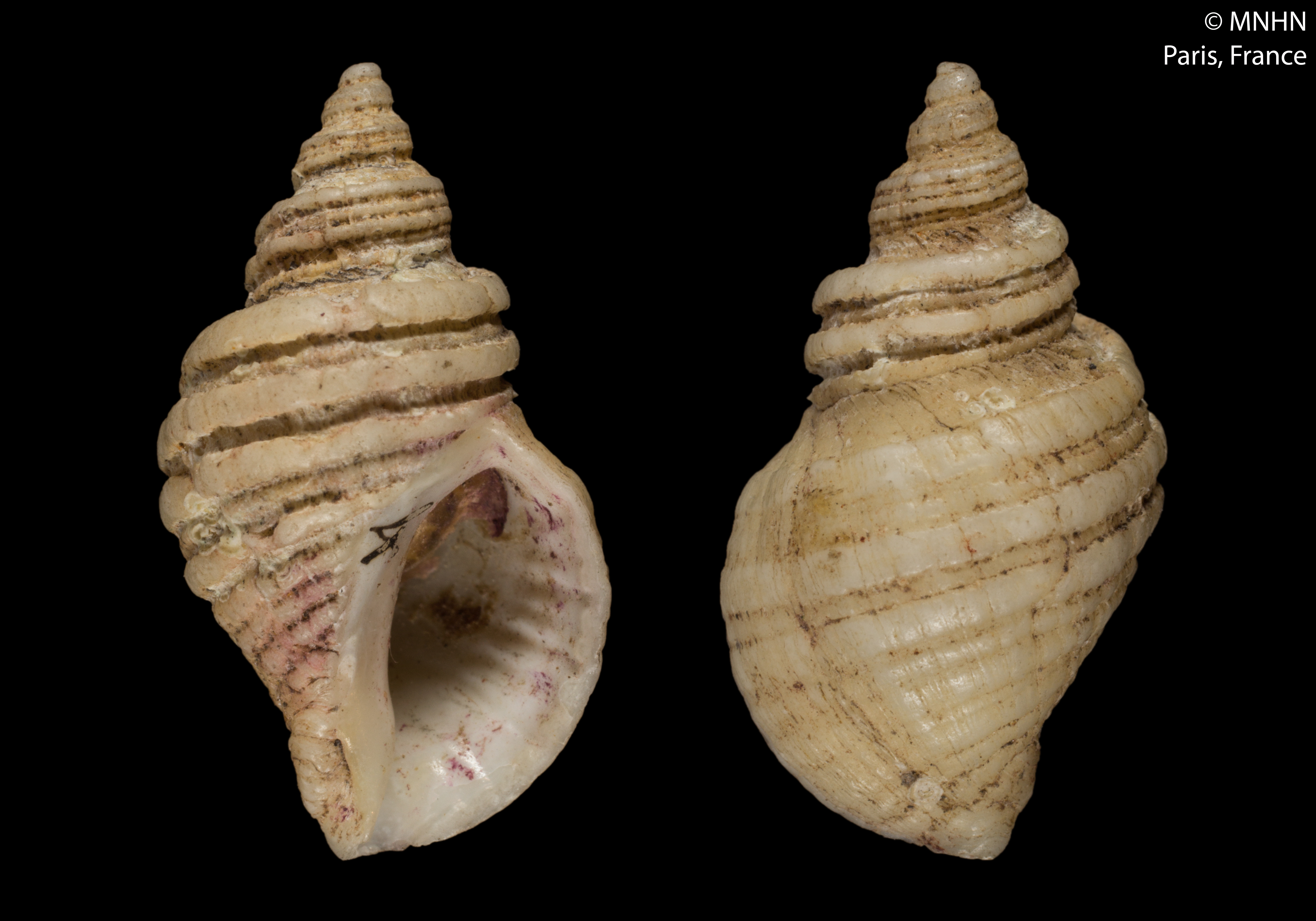
- Shell of Paratrophon dumasi (syntype at MNHN, Paris)

Scientific classification
- Kingdom: Animalia
- Phylum: Mollusca
- Class: Gastropoda
- Subclass: Caenogastropoda
- Order: Neogastropoda
- Family: Muricidae
- Genus: Paratrophon
- Species: P. dumasi

Binomial name
- Paratrophon dumasi (Vélain, 1877)Paratrophon dumasi (Vélain 1877)

Synonyms
- Purpura dumasi Vélain, 1877; Purpura dumasi var. cincta Vélain, 1877; Purpura dumasi var. multistriata Vélain, 1877; Purpura dumasi var. semicostata Vélain, 1877

= Paratrophon dumasi =

Species of gastropod

Paratrophon dumasi is a species of sea snail, a marine gastropod mollusk in the family Muricidae, the murex snails or rock snails.

== Distribution ==
This marine species occurs in Antarctic waters off the Islands Saint Paul & Amsterdam
