= Théodore Année =

French horticulturist (f. 1852–1866)

Théodore Année was a French horticulturist. He was a wealthy diplomatic consul in South America when he retired to France in the mid-1840s and settled in rue des Réservoirs, Passy, Paris. There he devoted himself to the culture of tropical plants from South America, having brought back with him the taste for plants with beautiful foliage, especially the Canna genus.

== Canna innovation ==
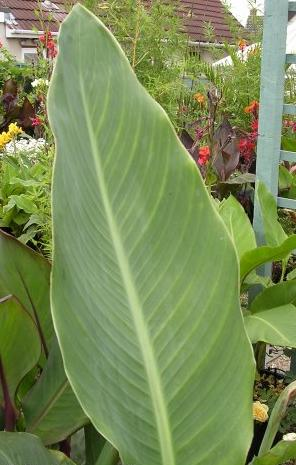
Canna (foliage group) 'Annei'

At that time in Europe, Canna species (common name cannas) were confined to botanical gardens, cultivated in greenhouses, and their custodians hardly dared to expose them to the open air, because of their tropical origins.

In 1846, Année, who had brought back from South America a collection of Canna species seed, trialed a solid mass of them in open ground. The main two species he trialed were C. indica and C. glauca (or C. nepalansis). The manner in which they flourished under the northern temperate climate of Passy exceeded his expectations. They flowered abundantly, which allowed him to try the first artificial pollination made on the Canna genus. He applied pollen from C. glauca onto C. indica, and the offspring of this crossing first flowered for Année in 1848. The resulting F1 hybrid was called Canna 'Annei'.

Année then spent the next six years bulking up the new hybrid until he was ready to introduce it to an amazed Parisian public. The popularity of cannas was such that 20,000 tufts of 'Annei' were said to be used in displays in Paris in 1861. He was rapidly joined by many other enthusiasts and professional horticulturists, as Canna hybrids enjoyed rapid popularity in France, and later the rest of Europe and North America. Amongst the professionals was rose breeder Pierre-Antoine-Marie Crozy of Avoux & Crozy, La Guillotière, Lyon, France, who first started hybridizing cannas in 1862, and who went on to become the greatest of Canna hybridists.

== Canna cultivation ==
Chaté, the author of Le Canna, stated of Année that he was, "A happy, skilful hybridiser, he operated on a great scale, thus became the creator of all the most beautiful varieties of the floral trade. All the amateurs and horticulturists who occupied themselves with foliage plants visited his garden, which he filled up each year with seedlings of canna[s]. We (the firm of Chaté et fils) owe him the majority of our successes. Thanks to his councils and his friendship, we delivered to the trade so great a number of canna innovations, and which enabled us to write this work."

Année then spent the next 20 years creating many more cultivars, until retiring to Nice, in southern France, in 1866. Fittingly, his last Canna cultivar was named C. 'Prémices de Nice'.

== See also ==
- Canna
- List of Canna cultivars
- List of Canna hybridists
- List of Canna species
