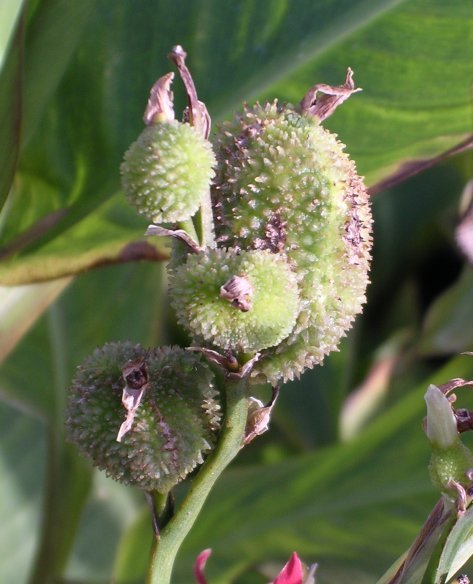
- fruit of C. patens

Scientific classification
- Kingdom: Plantae
- Clade: Tracheophytes
- Clade: Angiosperms
- Clade: Monocots
- Clade: Commelinids
- Order: Zingiberales
- Family: Cannaceae
- Genus: Canna
- Species: C. patens

Binomial name
- Canna patens (Roscoe) Tb. Tanaka

Synonyms
- Canna aura-vittata Lodd.; Canna humilis Bouché; Canna indica var. limbata Peters.; Canna indica var. patens Aiton; Canna limbata Roscoe; Canna longifolia Bouché; Canna montana Blume; Canna recurvata Bouché

= Canna patens =

Species of herb

Canna patens is a species of herb in the Cannaceae family.

== Description ==
Small sized with spreading habit and thick rhizomes (these up to 3 cm in diameter). Green ovate leaves; green triangular stems; upright spikes with flowers of yellow petals with a wide red margin; staminodes are long and narrow, edges regular; capsules globose.

== Taxonomy ==
Paul Maas and Nobuyuki Tanaka, both experts on the genus Canna have different opinions regarding this species. Maas considers C. patens a synonym of C. indica, but Tanaka considers it a distinct and separate species according to DNA analysis.

== See also ==
- Canna
- List of Canna species
- List of Canna cultivars
