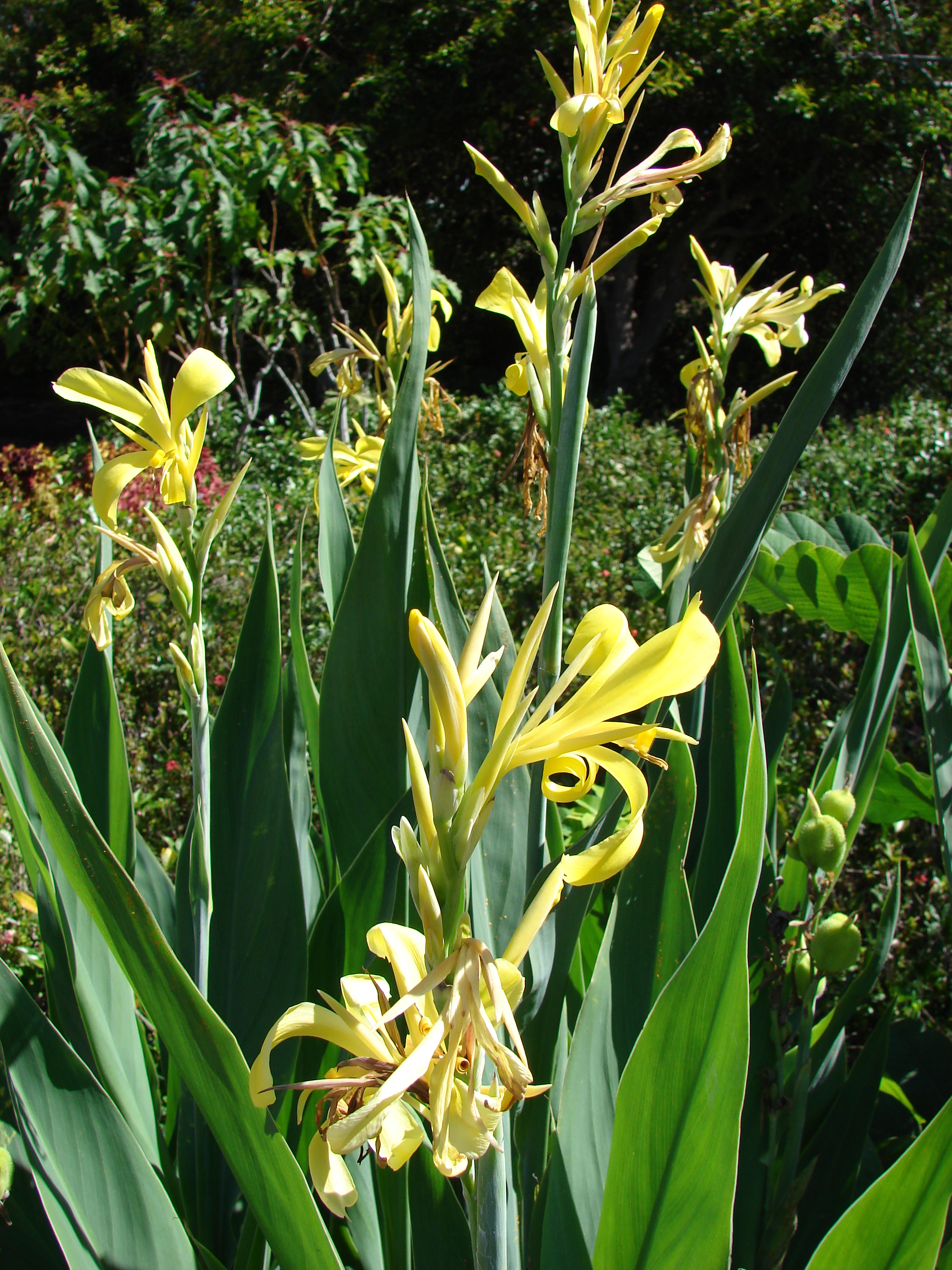

Conservation status
- Secure (NatureServe)

Scientific classification
- Kingdom: Plantae
- Clade: Tracheophytes
- Clade: Angiosperms
- Clade: Monocots
- Clade: Commelinids
- Order: Zingiberales
- Family: Cannaceae
- Genus: Canna
- Species: C. glauca

Binomial name
- Canna glauca L.

Synonyms
- Canna angustifolia L.; Canna elegans Raf.; Canna hassleriana Kraenzl.; Canna jacobiniflora T.Koyama & Nob.Tanaka; Canna lanceolata Lodd.; Canna liturata Link ex A.Dietr.; Canna mexicanna A.Dietr.; Canna pedicellata C.Presl.; Canna pruinosa Hoffmanns.; Canna schlectendaliana Bouché; Canna siamensis Kraenzl.; Canna stenantha Nob.Tanaka; Canna stolonifera D.Dietr.; Canna stricta Bouché

= Canna glauca =

Species of flowering plant

Canna glauca is a species of the Canna genus, a member of the family Cannaceae. It is commonly known as water canna or Louisiana canna. It is native to the wetlands of tropical America and was introduced to England in 1730. It is also reportedly naturalized in Sri Lanka, Thailand, Vietnam, Java and the Philippines.

== Description ==
It is a perennial herb growing 3–6 feet (91–183 cm) tall. It has narrow, blue-green (glaucous) leaves, atop of which sit its large, delicate, and pale yellow flowers.

== Distribution and habitat ==
C. glauca is native to the southeastern and south-central United States (Texas, Florida, Louisiana and South Carolina) as well as Mexico, Central America, South America and the West Indies. It is an aquatic species, growing as a marginal plant in up to about 15 cm (5.9 in) of still or slow-moving water.

== Taxonomy ==
Nobuyuki Tanaka, one of the leading researchers on genus Canna, recognises two varieties of Canna glauca: Canna glauca var. glauca and Canna glauca var. siamensis (Kraenzl) N.Tanaka. The latter variety widespread in South and Southeast Asia, where it is supposed to have differentiated within the past few centuries.

== Cultivation ==
The species prefers light (sandy), medium (loamy) and heavy (clay) soils and requires well-drained soil. The preferred soil is acid, neutral and basic (alkaline). It cannot grow in the shade and requires moist soil. It is hardy to zone 10 and is frost tender. In the north latitudes it is in flower from August to October, and the seeds ripen in October.

== Gallery ==
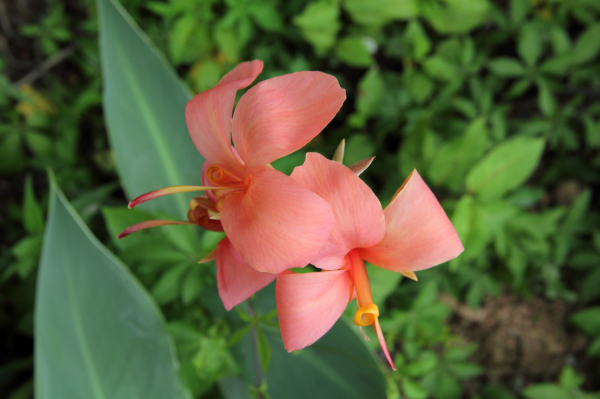

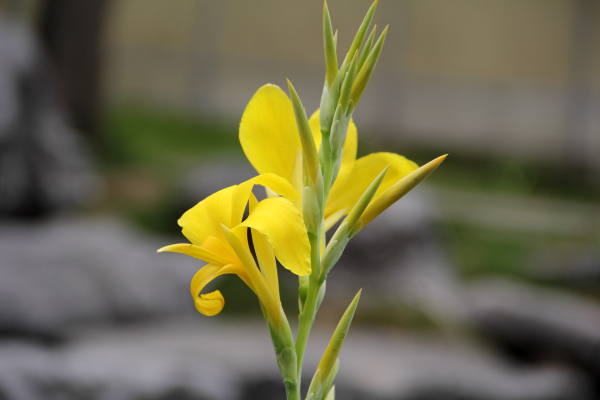

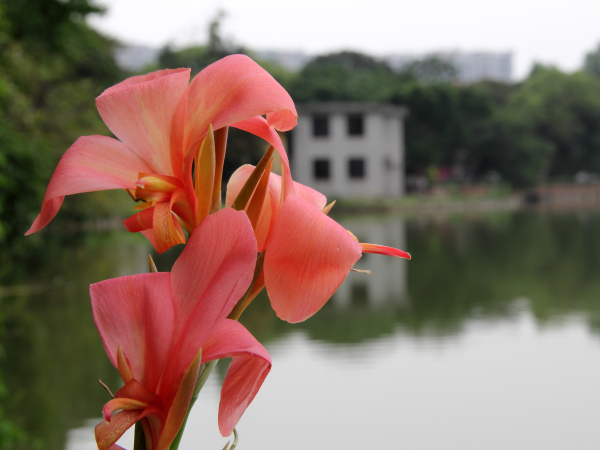
