= Canna bangii =

Scientific classification
- Kingdom: Plantae
- Clade: Tracheophytes
- Clade: Angiosperms
- Clade: Monocots
- Clade: Commelinids
- Order: Zingiberales
- Family: Cannaceae
- Genus: Canna
- Species: C. bangii

Binomial name
- Canna bangii Kraenzl.

Species of flowering plant

Canna bangii is a species of herb in the family Cannaceae. It is native to Peru and Bolivia.

== Description ==
Plants to 4m tall. Leaves green, lower side more or less soft, with downy hairs. Inflorescences repeatedly branched with persistent floral bracts. Flowers erect, orange-red, 4–7 cm long, composed of 8 or more coloured parts; petals not reflexed, staminodes 3 or more.

== Distribution ==
Native to Peru and Bolivia at 1,400–2,700 m (4,600–8,900 ft) of elevation.

== Cultivation ==
It is hardy to zone 10 and is frost tender. In the north latitudes it is in flower from August to October, and the seeds ripen in October. Rarely available in cultivation.
