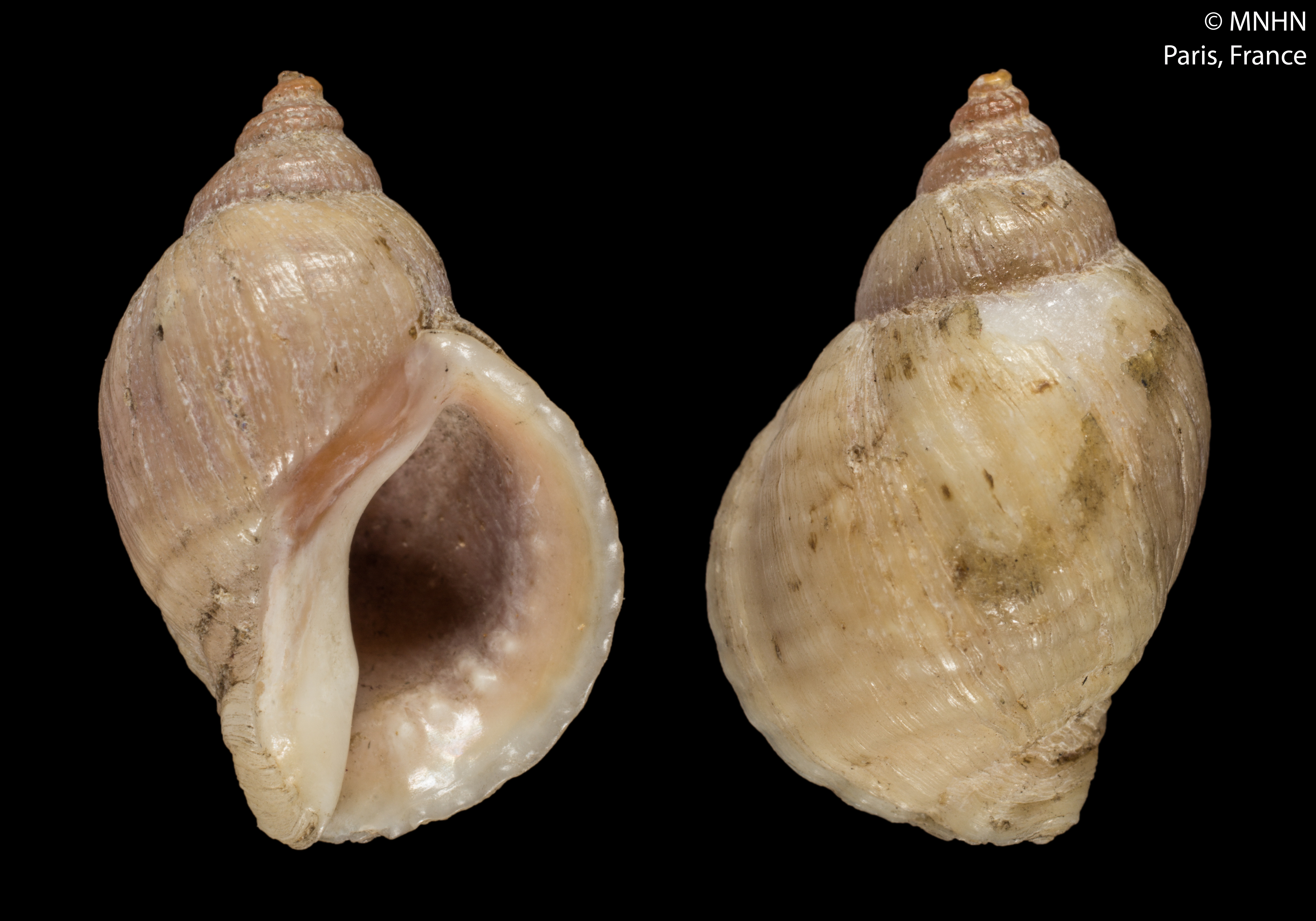
- Shell of Paratrophon patens (syntype at MNHN, Paris)

Scientific classification
- Kingdom: Animalia
- Phylum: Mollusca
- Class: Gastropoda
- Subclass: Caenogastropoda
- Order: Neogastropoda
- Family: Muricidae
- Genus: Paratrophon
- Species: P. patens

Binomial name
- Paratrophon patens (Hombron & Jacquinot, 1854)

Synonyms
- Purpura patens Hombron & Jacquinot, 1854

= Paratrophon patens =

Species of gastropod

Paratrophon patens is a species of sea snail, a marine gastropod mollusk in the family Muricidae, the murex snails or rock snails.

== Description ==
The length of the shell attains 20.8 mm.

== Distribution ==
This marine species is endemic to New Zealand.
