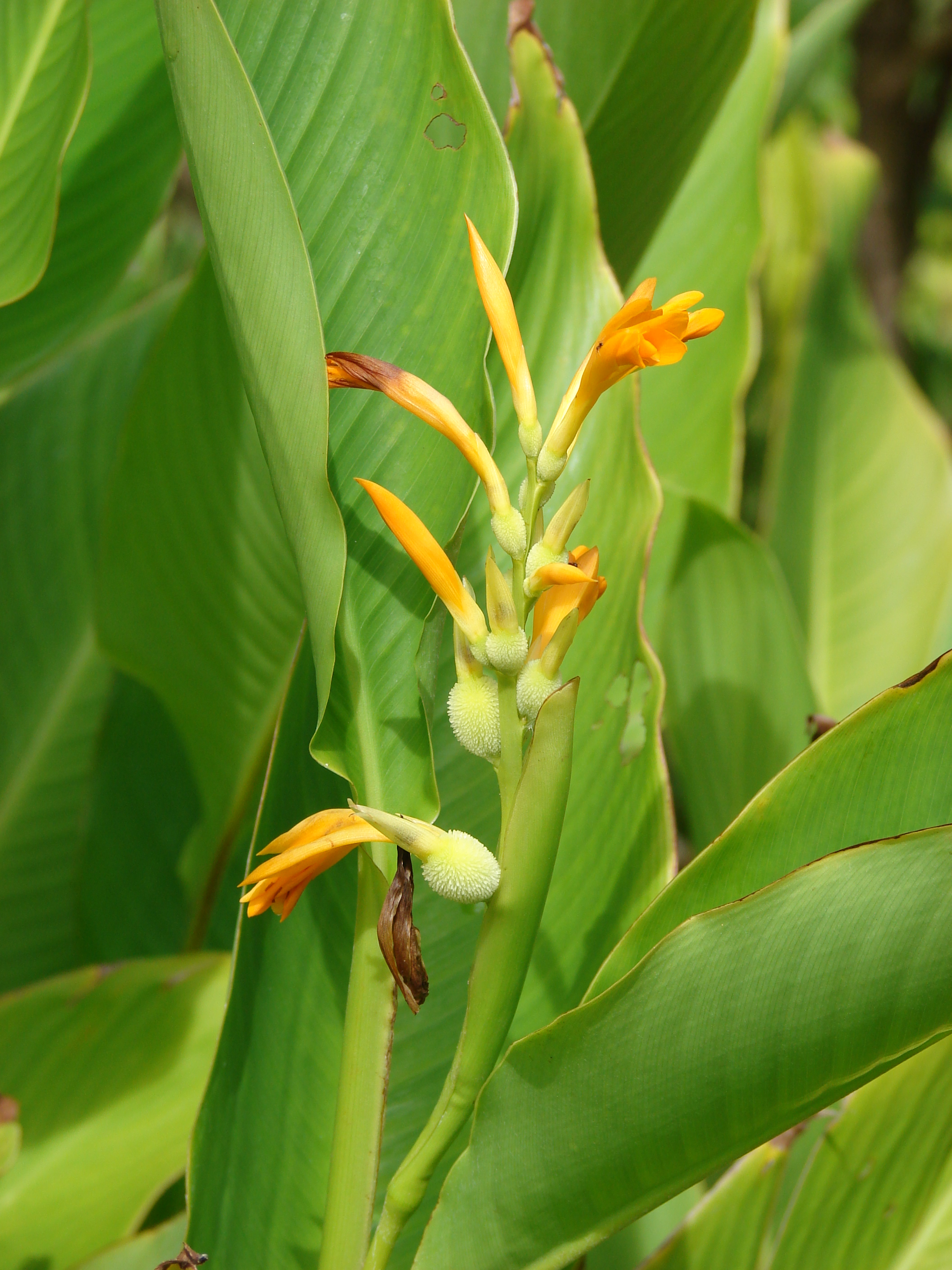

Scientific classification
- Kingdom: Plantae
- Clade: Tracheophytes
- Clade: Angiosperms
- Clade: Monocots
- Clade: Commelinids
- Order: Zingiberales
- Family: Cannaceae
- Genus: Canna
- Species: C. jaegeriana

Binomial name
- Canna jaegeriana Urb.

Synonyms
- Canna domingensis Urb.; Canna leucocarpa Bouché; Canna pertusa Urb.

= Canna jaegeriana =

Species of plant

Canna jaegeriana is a species of herb in the family Cannaceae.

== Description ==
Generally curved, orange, small (4–7.5 cm long) flowers with free part of staminodes erect, floral bracts mostly caducous, and upper side of leaves often dark brown to black in herbarium material, lower side more or less lanuginose. In addition, the seeds are ellipsoid and relatively small (4–7 × 2–4.5 mm).

== Distribution ==
It occurs in the Greater Antilles (Dominican Republic, Haiti, Puerto Rico) and tropical South America, north and west of the Amazon Basin (Venezuela, Ecuador, Peru, and Bolivia).

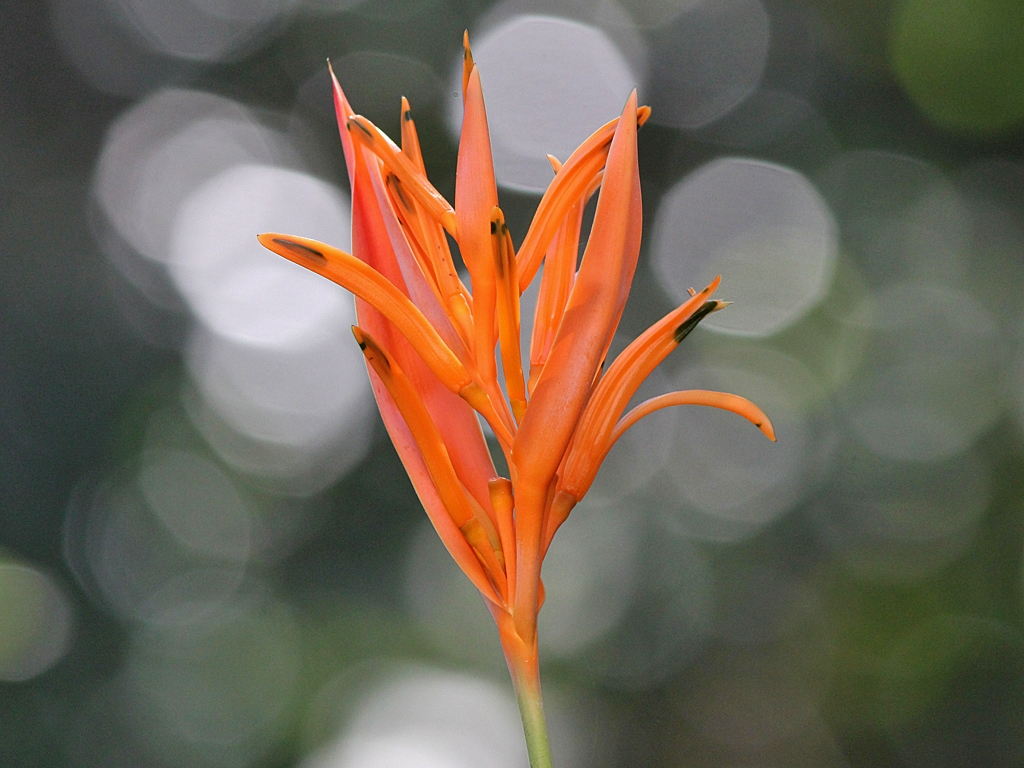
Seen in Kerala.
