= Canna liliiflora =

- Inflorescence.

Scientific classification
- Kingdom: Plantae
- Clade: Tracheophytes
- Clade: Angiosperms
- Clade: Monocots
- Clade: Commelinids
- Order: Zingiberales
- Family: Cannaceae
- Genus: Canna
- Species: C. liliiflora

Binomial name
- Canna liliiflora Warsz. ex Planch.

Synonyms
- Canna brittonii Rusby

Species of plant

Canna liliiflora is a species of herb in the family Cannaceae. It is native of Peru and Bolivia.

== Description ==
Herb up to 3 m with stout, erect stems. Leaves large, oblong, acuminate. Flowers 10–13 cm. (4-5") long, honeysuckle-scented, borne in a short, terminal raceme; perianth tubular, the three outer petaloid lobes linear-oblong, convolute, reflexed, tinged green, the three inner ones straight and extended, recurved at end, white, tinted yellowish-green.

== Cultivation ==
The species prefers light (sandy), medium (loamy) and heavy (clay) soils and requires well-drained soil. The preferred soil is acid, neutral and basic (alkaline). It cannot grow in the shade and requires moist soil. It is hardy to zone 10 and is frost tender. In the north latitudes it is in flower from August to October, and the seeds ripen in October.
