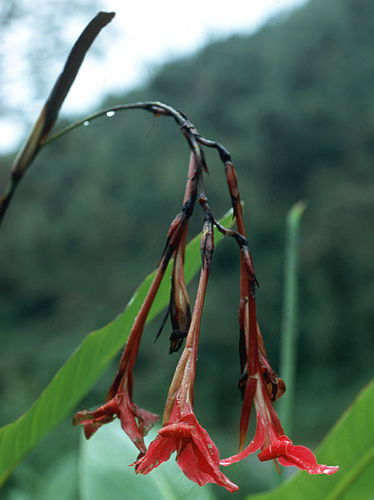

Scientific classification
- Kingdom: Plantae
- Clade: Tracheophytes
- Clade: Angiosperms
- Clade: Monocots
- Clade: Commelinids
- Order: Zingiberales
- Family: Cannaceae
- Genus: Canna
- Species: C. iridiflora

Binomial name
- Canna iridiflora Ruiz. & Pav.

Synonyms
- Achirida iridiflora (Ruiz & Pav.) Horan.

= Canna iridiflora =

Species of flowering plant

Canna iridiflora is a species of herb in the family Cannaceae.

== Description ==
Herb up to 5 m tall. Flowers hanging down in large pendants of pink, riding above large, green leaves. Spreading stems and gently spreading leaves creates a goblet shaped clump. Plant height 5 m (16 ft). The foliage is green with pale inner edge and dark outer edge. Flowers are pendant shaped carmine-red to purple, 10–14 cm (4-5½ in) long, with a relatively long tubular part and 8 coloured lobes; petals not reflexed; staminodes 4. The solitary staminal locule (pollin-producing portion of the stamen) can be up to 5.5 inches (14 centimeters) in length, equaled only by Strelitzia nicolai.

== Distribution ==
C. iridiflora is native to Peru, Colombia and Costa Rica at altitudes of 1,800–2,850 m (5,910–9,350 ft).

== Cultivation ==
It was introduced to England in 1816. It is hardy to zone 10 and is frost tender. In the north latitudes it is in flower from August to October, and the seeds ripen in October.
