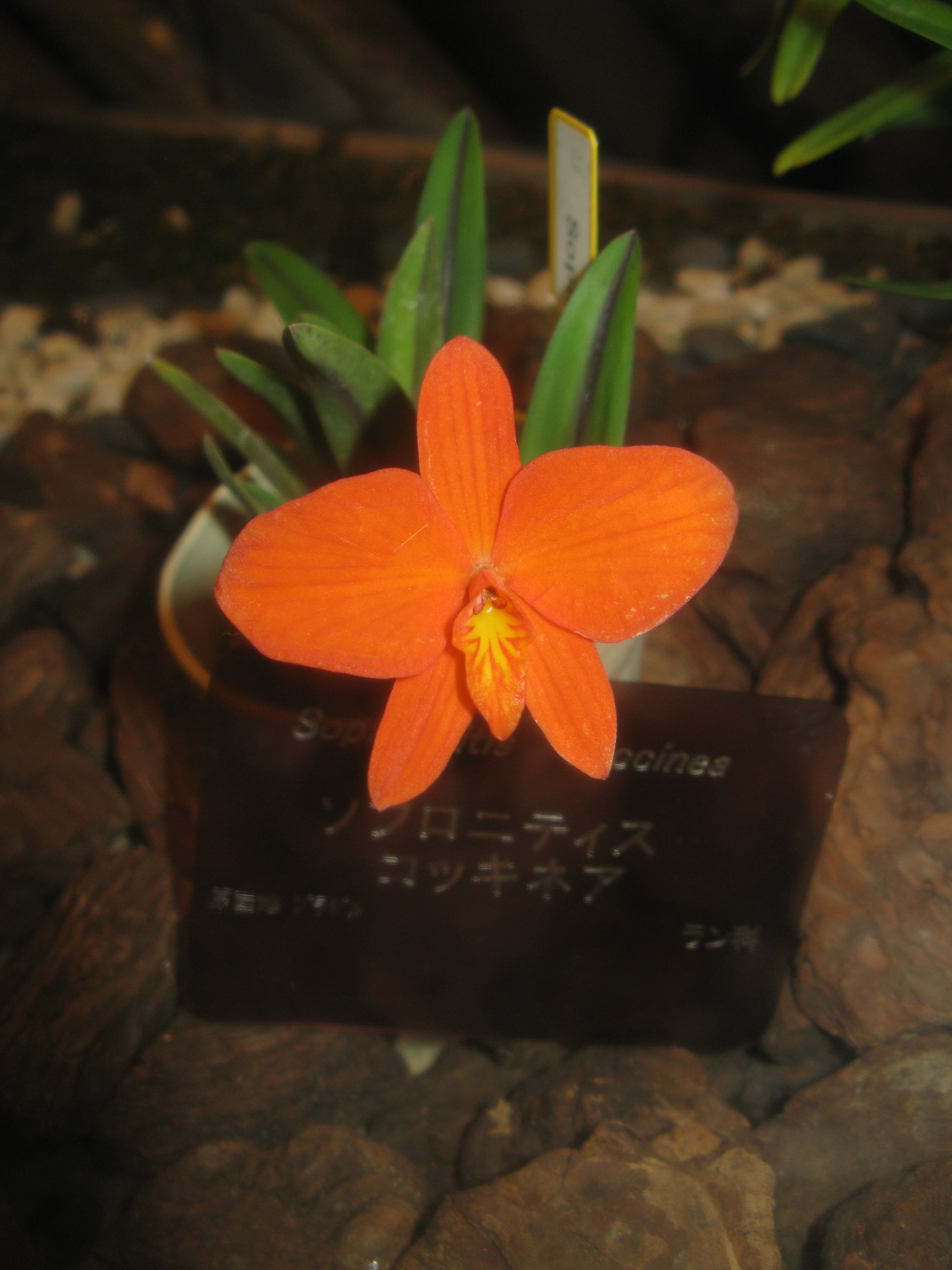
- Flower of Cattleya coccinea

Scientific classification
- Kingdom: Plantae
- Clade: Tracheophytes
- Clade: Angiosperms
- Clade: Monocots
- Order: Asparagales
- Family: Orchidaceae
- Subfamily: Epidendroideae
- Genus: Cattleya
- Subgenus: Cattleya subg. Cattleya
- Section: Cattleya sect. Crispae
- Species: C. coccinea

Binomial name
- Cattleya coccinea Lindl.

Synonyms
- Cattleya coccinea *Sophronitis grandiflora Lindl.; Cattleya grandiflora (Lindl.) Beer; Sophronitis militaris Rchb.f.; Sophronitis rossiteriana Barb.Rodr.; Sophronia coccinea (Lindl.) Kuntze; Sophronia militaris (Rchb.f.) Kuntze; Sophronitis coccinea (Lindl.) Rchb.f.; Sophronitis coccinea f. rossiteriana (Barb.Rodr.) Pabst & Dungs; Hadrolaelia coccinea (Lindl.) Chiron & V.P.Castro; Cattleya coccinea var. rossiteriana (Barb.Rodr.) Van den Berg

= Cattleya coccinea =

Species of orchid

Cattleya coccinea, also known as Sophronitis coccinea or Sophronitis grandiflora, is a species of orchid occurring in Atlantic Forest habitats, from southeastern Brazil to Argentina (Misiones).

== See also ==
- List of plants of Atlantic Forest vegetation of Brazil
