= Coccinea =

Coccinea may refer to:

- the plant genus Coccinia, the scarlet gourds
- the plant section Coccinea is the name of a species derivative to many plants, example Banksia sect. Coccinea, Banksia coccinea
