= Nobuyuki Tanaka =

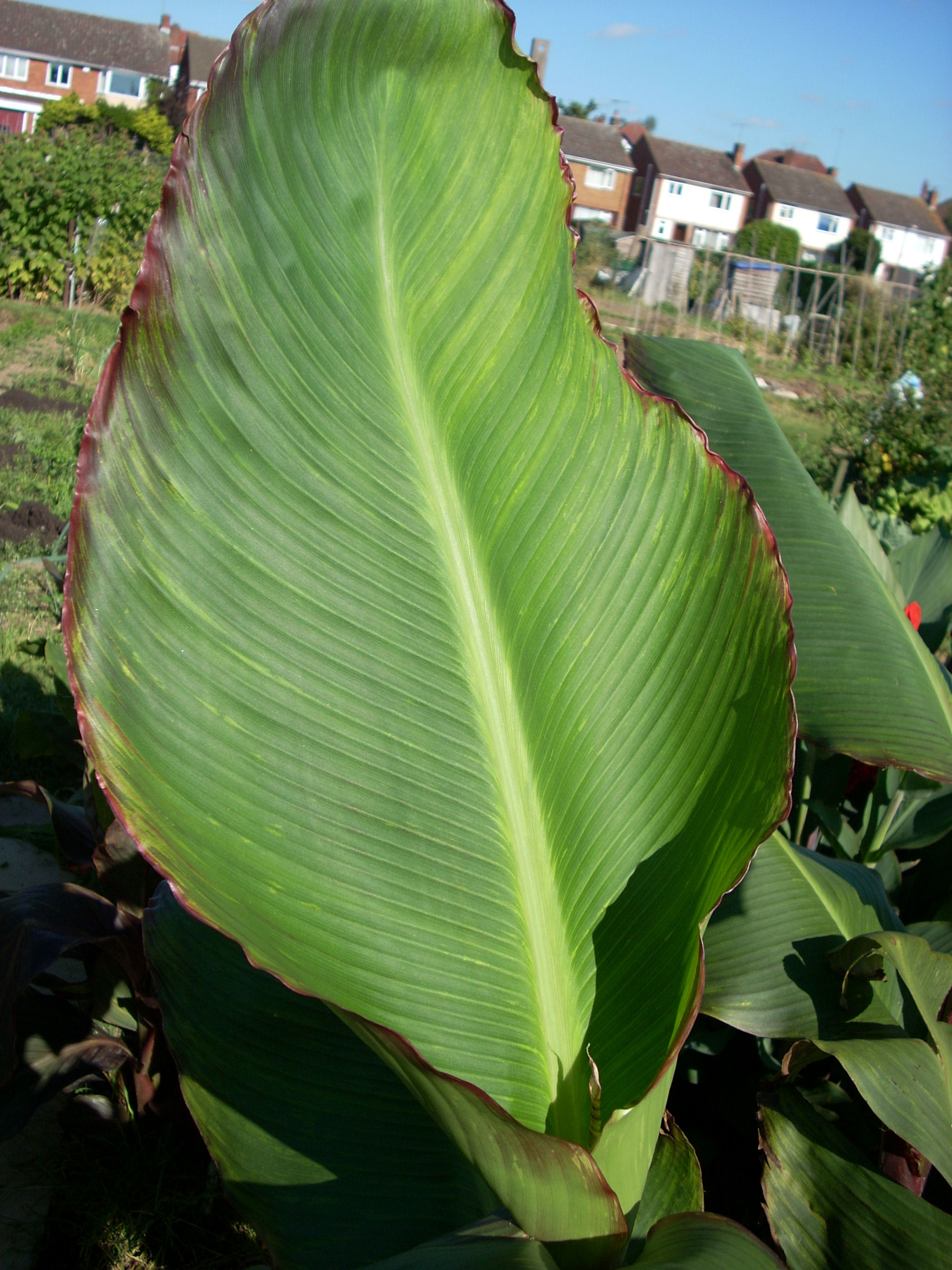
Canna discolor var. discolor (Lindl.) Nb.Tanaka

Nobuyuki Tanaka (田中 伸幸, Tanaka Nobuyuki) is an economic botanist at the Tokyo Metropolitan University, the Makino Botanical Garden in Kōchi Prefecture, Japan.

Tanaka is an expert on the family Cannaceae, and in 2001 published a revision of the family Cannaceae in the New World and Asia. Another contribution by Dr. Tanaka is to revise the Flora of Myanmar.

== Publications ==
- Nobuyuki Tanaka (2004): The utilization of edible Canna plants in southeastern Asia and southern China in Economic Botany 52 (1) pp 112–114 The New York Botanical Garden.
- Ito, Y., T. Ohi-Toma, Nb. Tanaka, and J. Murata (2009) New or noteworthy plant collections from Myanmar (3) Caldesia parnassifolia, Nechamandra alternifolia, Potamogeton maackianus and P. octandrus. Journal of Japanese Botany 84: 321-329.
- Ito, Y., T. Ohi-Toma, Nb. Tanaka, Nr. Tanaka & J. Murata (2014) New or noteworthy plant collections from Myanmar (8) Blyxa aubertii var. echinosperma, Lemna trisulca, and Najas tenuis. APG: Acta Phytotaxonomica et Geobotanica 65: 53-61.
- Ito, Y., Nr. Tanaka, R. Pooma, and Nb. Tanaka (2014) DNA barcoding reveals a new record of Potamogeton distinctus (Potamogetonaceae) and its natural hybrids, P. distinctus × P. nodosus and P. distinctus × P. wrightii (P. ×malainoides) from Myanmar. Biodiversity Data Journal 2: e1073. doi: 10.3897/BDJ.2.e1073
- Ito, Y., Nb. Tanaka (2014) Chromosome studies in the aquatic monocots of Myanmar: A brief review with additional records. Biodiversity Data Journal 2: e1069. doi: 10.3897/BDJ.2.e1069
