= Canna 'Roma' =

Flowering plant cultivar

- Genus: Canna
- Cultivar group: Italian Group
- Cultivar: 'Roma'

Canna Italian Group 'Roma' is a tall aquatic Italian Group cultivar, equally at home as a water marginal or in the border; large green foliage, oval shaped, white margin, upright habit; round stems, coloured green & purple; flowers are open, yellow with orange blotches, throat red-orange, staminodes are large, edges lightly frilled, stamen is orange-red, petals red, fully self-cleaning; seed is sterile, pollen is low fertile; rhizomes are long and thin, coloured white and pink; tillering is prolific. Introduced by C. Sprenger, Dammann & Co., Naples, Italy, EU in 1898.

== Gallery ==
Canna 'Roma'

Extract from 1998 illustration in Revue Horticole

== Synonyms ==
- Canna 'Cattleya' - sometime used as a synonym for Canna 'Italia' as well.
- Canna 'Florence Vaughan' - this name belongs to a totally different Crozy Group cultivar.
- Canna 'Golden Eagle'
- Canna 'Heinrich Seidel' - this name belongs to a totally different cultivar.
- Canna 'Jennifer'
- Canna 'Madame Crozy' - this name belongs to a totally different Crozy Group cultivar.
- Canna 'Mrs Cozy'
- Canna 'Orange Humbert'
- Canna 'Orange King Humbert'
- Canna 'Papillon'
- Canna 'Sunburst'
- Canna 'Yellow King Humbert' - this name belongs to a totally different cultivar.

== See also ==
- Canna
- List of Canna species
- List of Canna cultivars
- List of Canna hybridists
