= Canna 'Roi Humbert' =

Flowering plant cultivar

- Genus: Canna
- Cultivar group: Italian Group
- Cultivar: 'Roi Humbert'

Canna 'Roi Humbert' is an Italian Group canna cultivar; bronze foliage, ovoid shaped, spreading habit; oval stems, coloured purple; flowers are cupped, self-coloured scarlet, staminodes are large, edges ruffled, fully self-cleaning; seed is sterile, pollen is sterile; rhizomes are thick, up to 3 cm in diameter, coloured purple; tillering is average. Introduced by C. Sprenger, Dammann & Co, Naples, Italy, EU in 1908.

C. 'Roi Humbert is the result of an F2 crossing, namely C. 'Madame Crozy' x C. flaccida produced C. 'Italia', then C. 'Madame Crozy ' was crossed with C. 'Italia'. This reinforced the characteristics of the Italian Group, as the cultivars derived from the C. flaccida cross have subsequently been named. Its rhizomes are heavily marked with maroon and have the shape of the C. indica side of the family, as do the leaves. The colour of the flower comes from the Crozy side, but the petal form is heavily influenced by the thinner and larger C. flaccida blooms.

At the time of its introduction, the breeder C. Sprenger claimed that "Roi Humbert will surprise the horticultural world". Subsequently, it prided a chimera mutation, called Canna 'Yellow King Humbert', that has surprised the world. Did Sprenger know about the potential of such a mutation? The cultivar is a triploid, confirmed by (Dr Khoshoo). It received the ultimate award from the RHS, the Award of Merit (AM) in 1909.

== Synonyms ==
- Canna 'King Humbert'
- Canna 'King of Prussia'
- Canna 'New Red'
- Canna 'Red King'

== Gallery ==
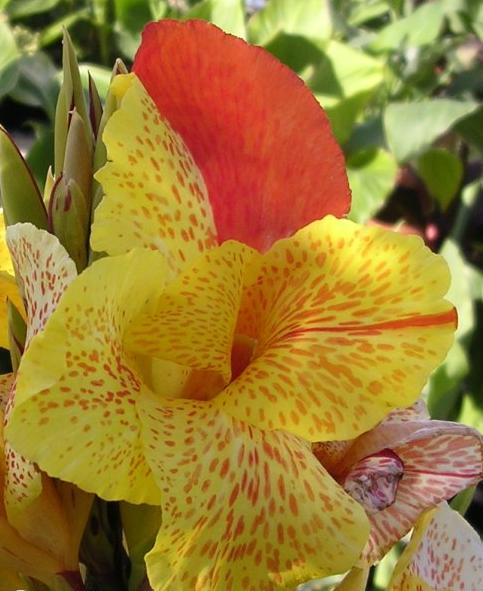
Canna Italian Group 'Yellow King Humbert'

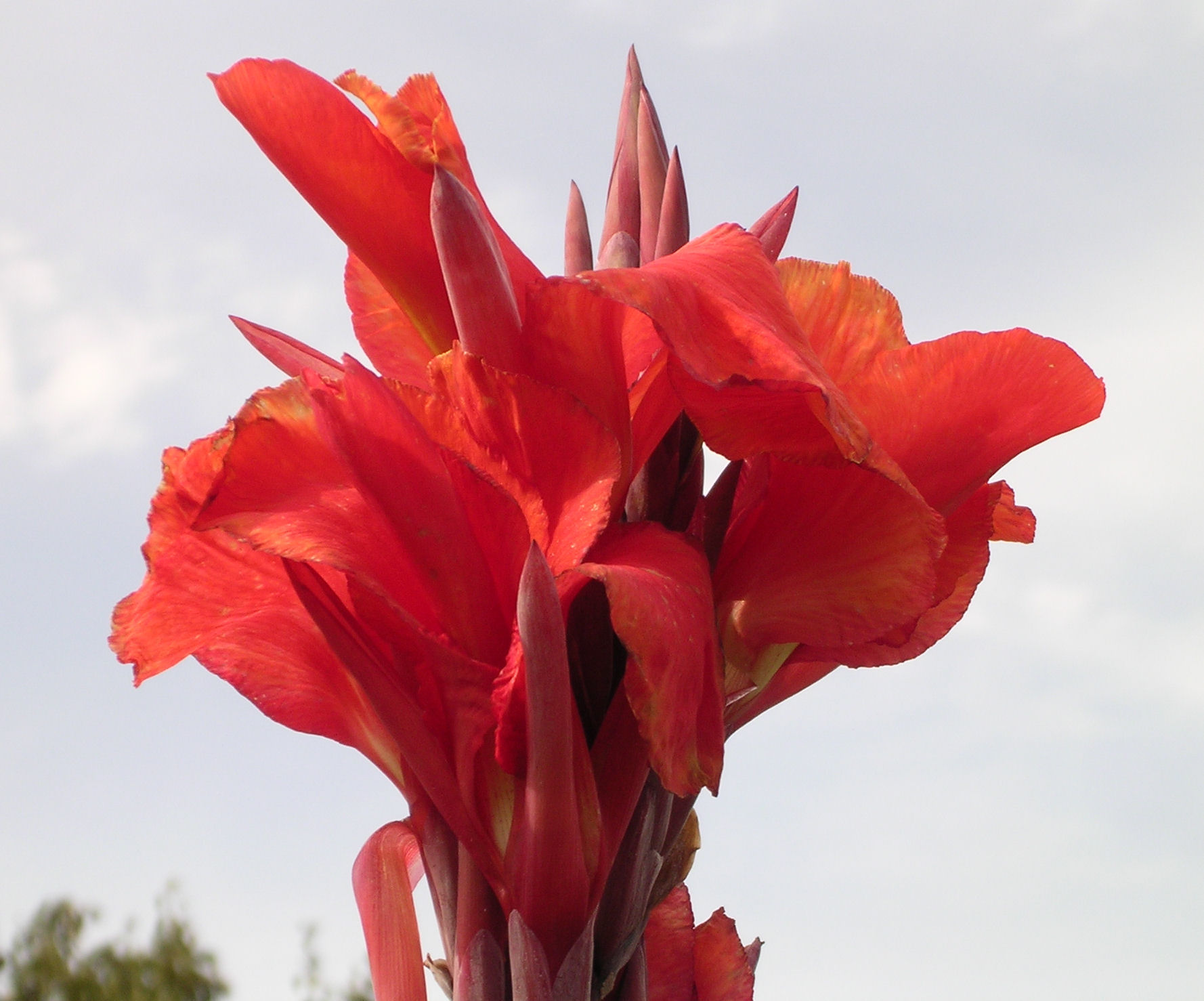

== See also ==
- Canna
- Canna 'Yellow King Humbert'
- List of Canna cultivars
- List of Canna hybridists
- List of Canna species
- Canna gallery
