= Sydney Percy-Lancaster =

British-Indian landscape gardener (1886–1972)

Sydney Percy-Lancaster FLS (19 July 1886, Meerut, India – 9 May 1972, New Delhi) was an English landscape gardener who worked in India. Both his father as well as his son worked as gardeners.

== Career ==
Percy-Lancaster's father, Percy Joseph Lancaster, was a banker and a talented amateur gardener, who went on to become the secretary of the Agri Horticultural Society of India in Calcutta, India. In 1902 Sydney Percy-Lancaster apprenticed at the Agri-Horticultural Society and on his father's death in 1904, he was appointed an assistant. He continued collecting and hybridising the Alipore Canna Collection, started by his father in 1892, they were the most popular garden plant in India at that time. It was said that every Canna cultivar growing in India had been derived from the Agri-Horticultural Society, where the collection was domiciled.

In 1910, he became an assistant secretary and then the secretary in 1914 until his retirement in October 1953, after a long service to the society and to Indian horticulture as a whole. Unlike most of his countrymen who packed up and return to England in 1947, upon the independence of India from the British Empire, Percy-Lancaster stayed on and made India his home. In 1947, he was the last Englishman to hold the post of Superintendent of Horticultural Operations, Government of India.

In November 1953, he joined the National Botanic Gardens at Lucknow as senior technical assistant because of his early life's association with Sikandar Bagh. He wished to spend the remainder of his life at Lucknow where the gardening traditions of his family began. He served the National Botanic Gardens of India until January 1959 when his son, Alick Percy-Lancaster pressed him to join the family at Salisbury (Southern Rhodesia), taking with him the family's Alipore Canna Collection for enjoyment in retirement. In November 1961, after his wife's death in 1960 and Alick's death in 1961, he returned to the National Botanic Gardens, where he spent the last of his years.

== Horticultural achievements ==
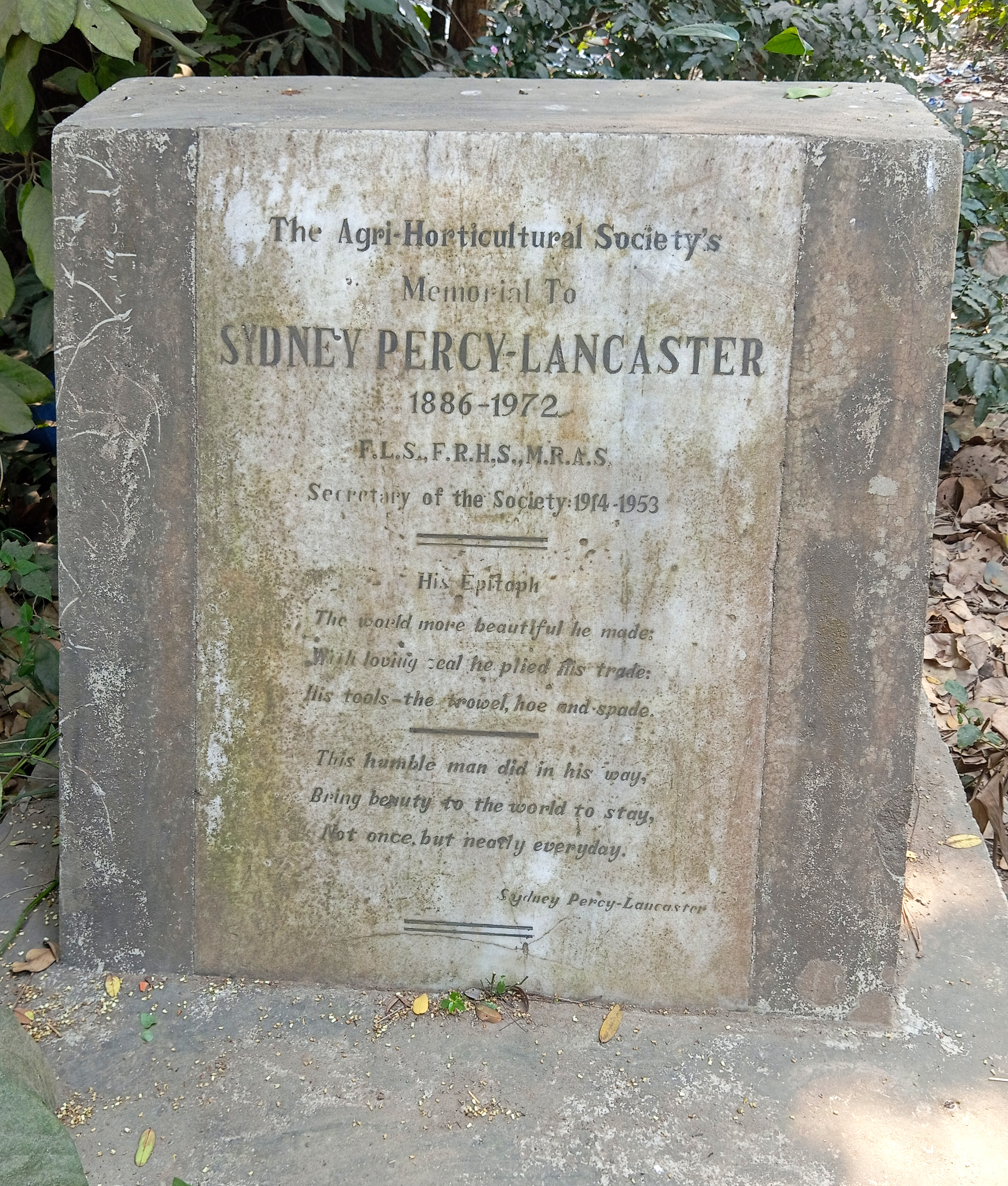
Memorial stone of Sydney Percy-Lancaster inside Agri-Horticultural Society of India Garden at Alipore, Kolkata, India.

During the work of about half a century in Calcutta, Mr. Percy-Lancaster introduced many new plants from abroad. He had a fascination for hybridization work and many plants found in India now owe their origin to him. A complete list of the hybrids is catalogued in the records of the Agri-Horticultural Society of India. He discovered many interesting mutants in Acalypha, Canna, Codiaceum, Hibiscus, Malvaniscus, Panax and Sansevieria. In the National Botanic Gardens at Lucknow, he helped to improve many parts of the garden, in particular the conservatory with which he had an association as a boy.

== Hybridization ==
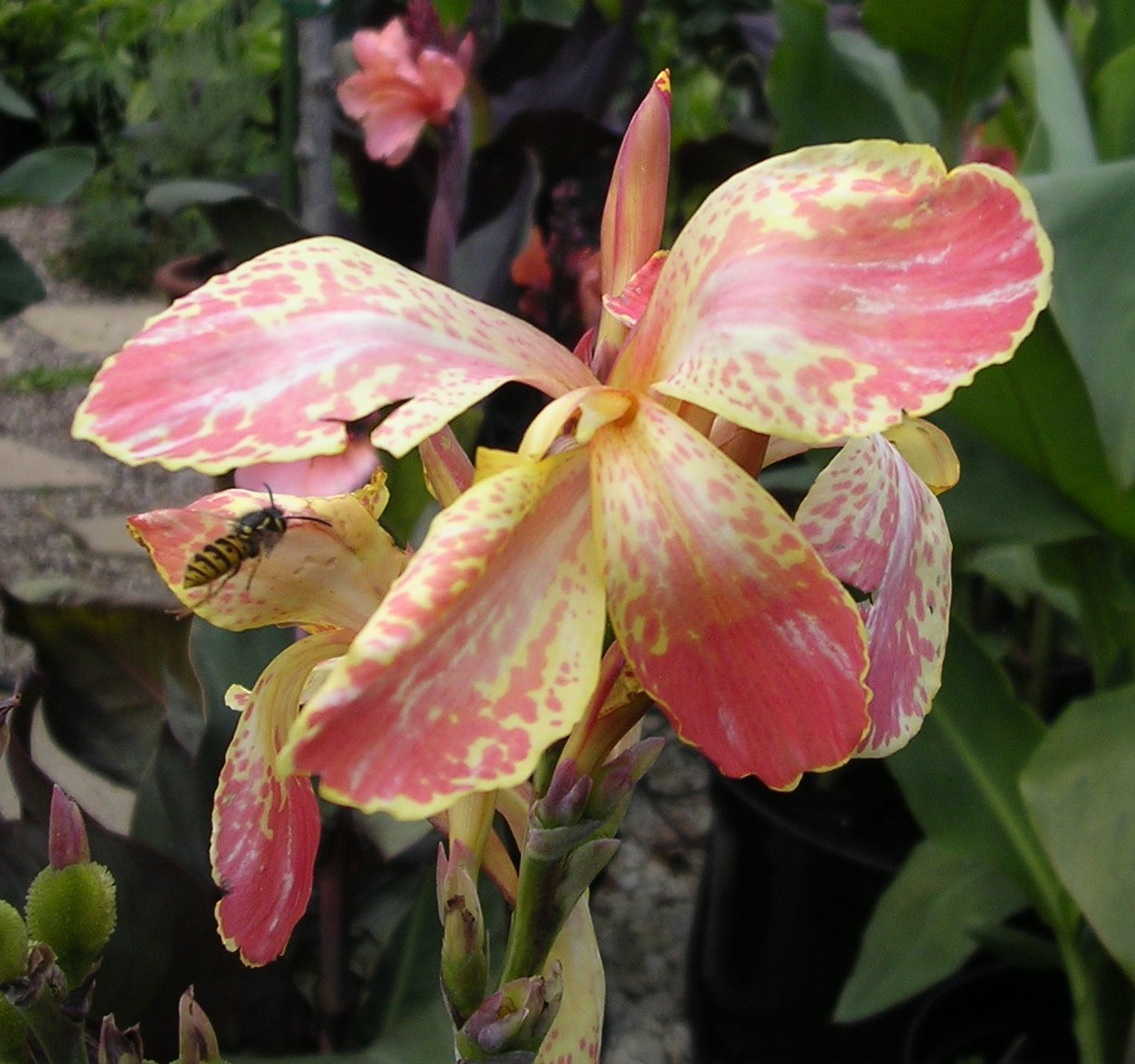
Canna (Crozy Group) 'Percy Lancaster', Sydney Percy-Lancaster

Percy-Lancaster had particular fascination for hybridization, and many plants found in Indian gardens originated from his work. His zoned Cosmos called 'Alipore Beauty' renamed 'RatHance' by the famous American seed's man, Bodgers, has been distributed all over the world. There are many Cosmos variations in cultivation, the choicest being the 'Bicolor White Crest'. He has also developed a beautiful pyramidal headed Hollyhock from a presumed cross between Alcea rosea and Malva sylvestris. Repeating his father's cross between Cooperia and Zephyranthes, he obtained a large number of colour variations in the ensuing hybrids named Cooperanthes. These hybrids are far superior in colour and performance to either parent. Cooperanthes has now been merged in Zephyranthes proper. He made a number of crosses at varietal and specific level in genera such as, Amaryllis, Barleria, Bauhinia, Begonia, Bougainvillea, Canna, Cassia, Chrysanthemum, Crinum, Hedychium, Hemerocallis, Hibiscus, Ixora, Lagerstroemia, Petunia, Poinsettia, Rosa, and Tecoma.

== Recognitions ==
In recognition of the service rendered by the Agri-Horticultural Society, King George V permitted to prefix the word 'Royal' to the society's name, but following India's Independence, the Society dropped the royal distinction to reflect that independence.

- In recognition of his success with Cooperanthes, Prof. Hamilton P. Traub (Plant Life Society, USA) named in 1954 a horticultural genus ×Sydneya after him. This genus is based on the hybrids from the cross Zephyranthes × Habranthus.
- In horticulture several 'species' and 'varieties' arising from hybridisation or as mutations are named after Lancaster and his family. To quote a few of the important ones:
  - Acalypha lancasteri
  - Antigonon lancasteri
  - Bougainvillea 'Alick Lancaster'
  - B. 'Enid Lancaster'
  - B. 'Mrs Lancaster'
  - Cassia ×lancasteri
  - Crinum lancasteri
  - Hibiscus 'Percy-Lancaster'
  - Panax lancasteri
  - Sansevieria tri-elfasciata lancasteri
  - Gephyranthes lancasteri
- In 1939 he was awarded the Herbert Medal, which is the highest honour the International Bulb Society can bestow upon a person for meritorious achievement in advancing the knowledge of bulbous plants.

== Published works ==
He authored and published several books,

- 1929, In an Indian Garden
- Everyday Gardening in India
- For over 60 years he wrote several hundred articles on various aspects of gardening and garden plants as a Gardening Correspondent to several Indian newspapers, monthly magazines, and foreign journals.
- He edited the material of the Royal Agri-Horticultural Society from 1904 to 1920, when this publication ceased. Thereafter, Annual Reports of the Society carried items of interest and short articles by him.
- He was also the author from 1935 to 1953 of the monthly "Garden News Sheet" that was regularly published, except for about two years during World War II.
- He has written 55 bulletins published by the National Botanic Gardens. This collection ranges from detailed accounts on ornamental plants to plant breeding simplified, sacred plants of Hindus, garden lay out, etc.
- He gave several broadcasts, lectures, and popular talks to gardening clubs, schools and institutions.
- Most of his friends did not know that he composed a large collection of poems that were published.
