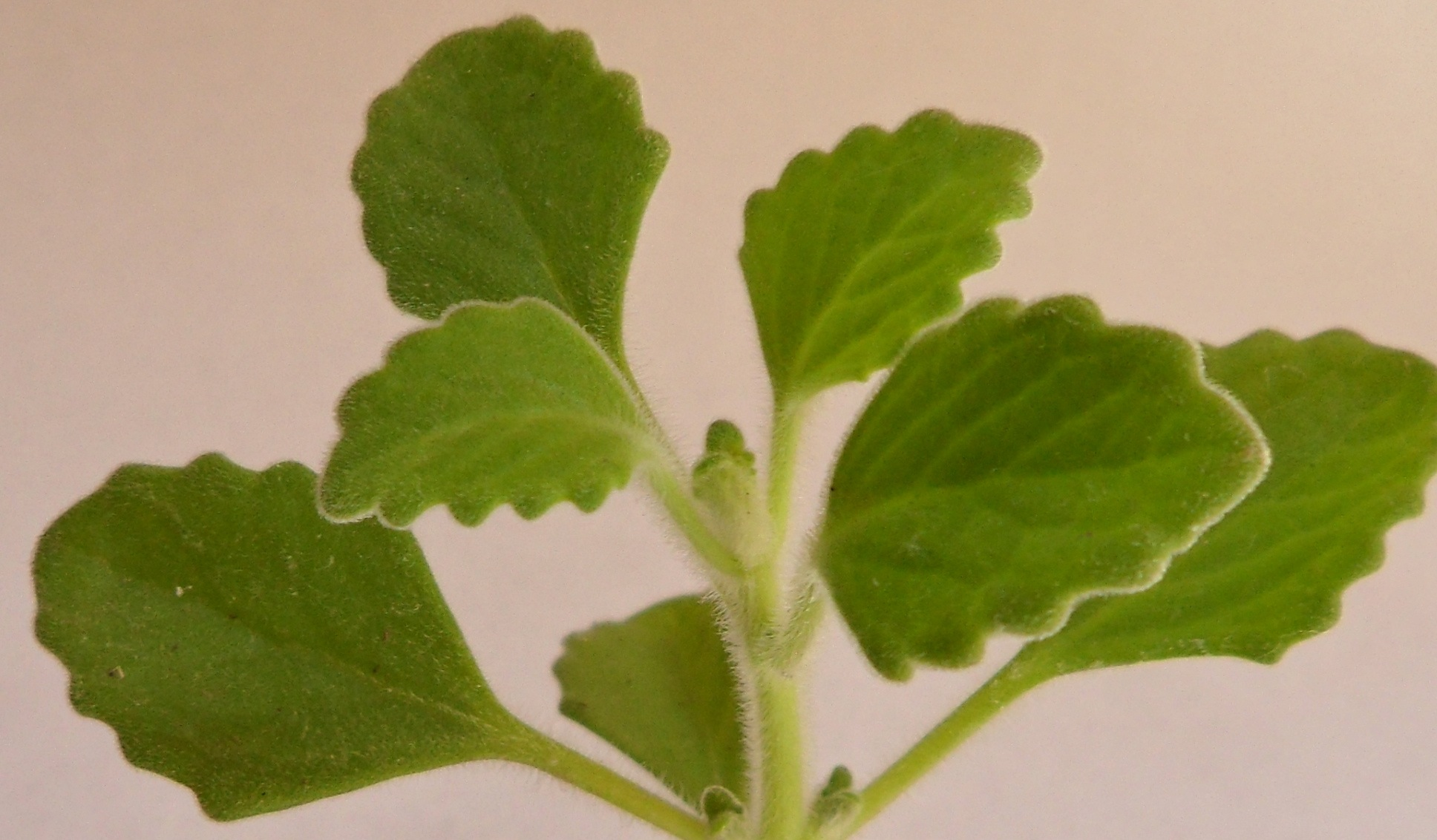

Scientific classification
- Kingdom: Plantae
- Clade: Tracheophytes
- Clade: Angiosperms
- Clade: Eudicots
- Clade: Asterids
- Order: Lamiales
- Family: Lamiaceae
- Genus: Plectranthus
- Species: P. hadiensis

Binomial name
- Plectranthus hadiensis (Forssk.) Schweinf. ex Sprenger

Synonyms
- Ocimum hadiense Forssk.; Coleus forsskaolii Briq.; Coleus personatus Lem.; Coleus rupestris Hochst. ex Briq.; Coleus schweinfurthii Vatke; Coleus zeylanicus (Benth.) L.H.Cramer; Germanea forsskaolii Poir.; Germanea horrida Hiern; Majana forsskaolii (Poir.) Kuntze; Plectranthus cyaneus Gürke; Plectranthus draconis Briq.; Plectranthus erlangeri Gürke; Plectranthus forsskaolii Vahl; Plectranthus fragrans Lebrun & Touss.; Plectranthus hararensis Gürke; Plectranthus horridus (Hiern) Baker; Plectranthus madagascariensis var. ramosior Benth.; Plectranthus pachyphyllus Gürke ex T.Cooke; Plectranthus paucicrenatus Franch.; Plectranthus petrensis S.Moore; Plectranthus ramosior (Benth.) van Jaarsv.; Plectranthus rupestris Vatke ex Baker; Plectranthus tomentosus Benth.; Plectranthus woodii Gürke; Plectranthus zatarhendi var. tomentosus (Benth.) Codd; Plectranthus zatarhendi var. woodii (Gürke) Codd; Plectranthus zatarhendii var. zatarhendii; Plectranthus zeylanicus Benth.

= Plectranthus hadiensis =

Species of plant

Plectranthus hadiensis is a perennial herbaceous plant of the family Lamiaceae.

== Description ==
Plectranthus hadiensis is a perennial herbaceous shrub with pubescent and semi-succulent stems, and a straight to decumbent habit. Its height varies 50 cm to 1.5 m (30–59 in), with a maximum base diameter of 1m (39 in). The leaves of the plant are arranged alternately on the plant's stem, they have coarse textures; an ovate shape; densely woolly-tomentose; are apex acute to rounded, cuneate with subcordate base; and a superficial to fairly crenate-dentate margin. The petiole is 10 to 40 mm long. The terminal inflorescences of the plant are simple and have 1 to 2 pairs of lateral branches near the base. The flowers of the plant are generally in shades of mauve to purple (occasionally white), and are bilabiated with a tube-shaped corolla of 8 to 15 mm that widens from the base, finely pubescent and with glands on the lips.

There are three varieties of P. hadiensis:

- Variety hadiensis, distributed in coastal and midland areas of the KwaZulu-Natal woodlands and the east of South Africa;
- Variety tomentosus, in semi-coastal zones from the Great Kei River to the KwaZulu-Natal coast.
- Variety woodii, distributed in arid habitats in eastern Cape and KwaZulu-Natal.

== Distribution and habitat ==
The species is found in Transkei, Natal, Eswatini, the Transvaal, eastern tropical Africa, Somalia and the southern Arabian Peninsula. The plant can be found on the fringes of forests, in dry forests and amongst rocks in grasslands and lowlands.

== Cultivation and uses ==
Plectranthus hadiensis is widely used as an ornamental plant because it is easy to cultivate, propagate and maintain. The compounds of the plant were formerly used to poison fish and more traditionally as an enema. It is used to ward off evil spirits. In Uganda it is used to heal wounds and peptic ulcers.

== Properties ==
The plant's use as a pharmacological agent is being investigated as it contains large quantities of essential oils, it is also being investigated for use against respiratory infections. However, ointments made with compounds extracted from the plant must not contain menthol, camphor or eucalyptus.

== Taxonomy ==
Plectranthus hadiensis was discovered by Peter Forsskål in Hadiyah, Yemen. It was described in Flora of Egypt and Arabia in 1775 with the name Ocimum hadiensis. At that time the genus Plectranthus had not been established, however it was the first species of the genus described and in 1894 the botanists Schweinfurth and Sprenger transferred it to the new genus, publishing it in Wiener Illustrirte Garten-Zeitung 19: 2. 1894.

== Bibliography ==
1. AFPD. 2008. African Flowering Plants Database - Base de Donnees des Plantes a Fleurs D'Afrique.
