= List of Canna hybridists =

The first hybridisation of Cannas was performed in 1848, and since then many Canna hybridizers have made their contribution to the genus over the centuries. This is a date ordered list of those people and their brief stories.

== 1848 Théodore Année ==
A retired French diplomatic agent in America, the gentleman gardener Monsieur Théodore Année of Passy, France, brought back from his travels the seeds of several Canna species, and in 1848 he crossed C. glauca with C. indica, so producing the first known and recorded Canna hybrid, C. x annaei André, now referred to as C. 'Annei'. Année was rapidly joined by many other enthusiasts and professional horticulturists as Canna hybrids enjoyed rapid popularity in France. In 1866 he retired to Nice, France, and from there released his last recorded cultivar, C. 'Prémices de Nice'.

== 1850s Jean Liabaud ==
A resident of Lyon, France.

== 1850s E. Chaté et fils ==
A resident of Paris, France.

== 1860s Jean Sisley ==
A resident of Lyon, France.

== 1860s Mr Goujon and Mr Jules Chretien ==
Resident of Lyon, France. Both supervisors of the Tete d’Or park.

== 1862 Antoine Crozy ==
Canna (Crozy Group) 'Madame Crozy' (Crozy)

Amongst the professionals who joined in the enthusiasm for new Canna cultivars was the rose breeder Monsieur Antoine Crozy of Lyon, France, who first started hybridising Cannas in 1862 and continued introducing new canna cultivars at a rapid rate until his death in 1903, giving his name to a whole new group of floriferous Canna cultivars. Crozy aîné (French for "elder"), as he was universally known, was succeeded by his son, Michel Crozy (1871–1908). He was also accorded the nickname of Papa Canna, as he was considered to be the father of Cannas. Unfortunately, no images of this remarkable man appear to have survived over the years.

== 1870s Monsieur Nardy ==
Resident of Lyon, France.

== 1880s Wilhelm Pfitzer ==
Messrs Wilhelm Pfitzer from Fellbach in Germany produced over 300 new cultivars up until the early 1950s. Many generations of the founder, Wilhelm, followed in the business, which is still in existence on a small scale. Wilhelm's son Walter took over control of the business in the 1870s until his death in 1931. Until then, Walter Pfitzer was still in demand judging at international fairs, exhibitions, and shows, retaining his presidency and Vice Presidency of the German and British Gladiolus Societies respectively, right until the end. His continual interest in Cannas meant a steady supply of new cultivars being produced each year.

In 1933, there were about 150 employees worldwide. That same year, in order to celebrate the elevation of Fellbach to the status of a city, the firm named one of its best seedlings that year as Canna ‘Stadt Fellbach’, meaning ‘City of Fellbach’. That is still a popular cultivar in this day and age.

Walter's children Paul, Anna & Rudolf followed their father into the business, but in the 1950s they were forced to abandon the breeding of Cannas, as the high cost of German labour meant that they could no longer compete with Mediterranean countries, who also enjoyed a more favourable climate.

== 1880 Vilmorin-Andrieux & Cie ==
Messrs Vilmorin-Andrieux & Cie in France produced a considerable number of new cultivars during the last century.

== 1890s Antoine Wintzer ==
Although thought of primarily as rose hybridists, the US firm of Conard Pyle Co. also contributed large numbers of cultivars in the early part of the 1900s, under the guidance of its chief hybridist Antoine Wintzer. Wintzer worked in collaboration with Dr van Fleet, of the USDA, to produce many new Canna varieties.

== 1887 Dammann & Cie ==
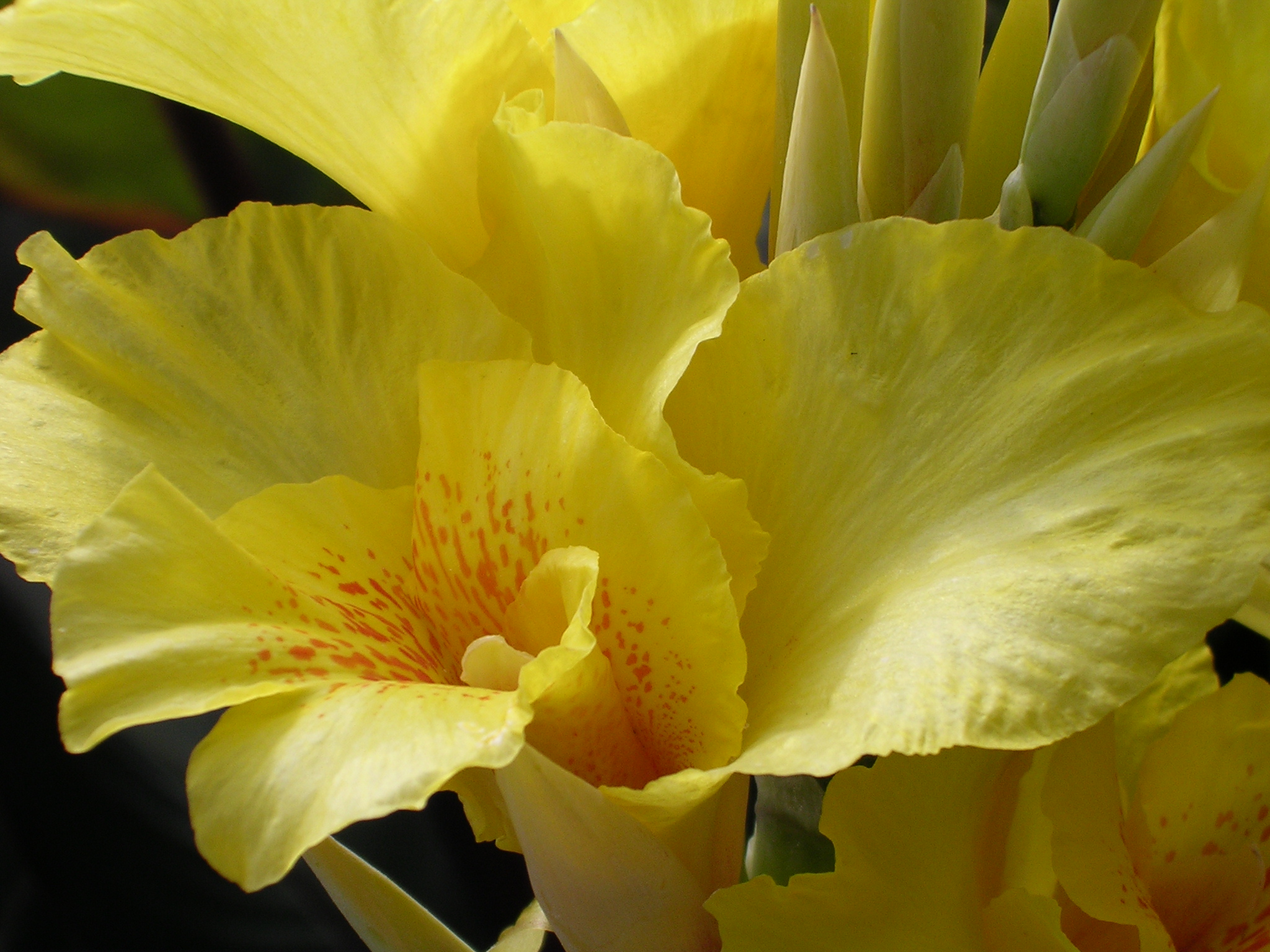
Canna (Italian Group) 'Austria' (Dammann)

One of Crozy's most beautiful creations was the cultivar Canna 'Madame Crozy', that has a beautiful crimson red colour with a golden margin. It was used by the Italian horticulturist Carl Spenger, from the Dammann establishments at San Giovanni a Teduccio near Naples, to create the "Canna with orchid flowers" or "Italian Canna", as they were known. Examples of varieties having the Canna hybrid Madame Crozy as a parent, are C. 'Austria' (1893), C. 'Italia' (1893), C. 'Alemania' (1894), C. 'Britannia' (1895), C. 'Heinrich Seidel'(1895). There is recorded knowledge of 57 cultivars originating from this prolific nursery, until its destruction by the eruption of the Mount Vesuvius volcano in the early 1900s.

== 1880s Victor Lemoine ==
Victor Lemoine was a resident of Nancy, France, and considered and was the first foreigner to receive the Victorian Medal of Horticulture of the Royal Horticultural Society. He also received the George R. White Medal of Honor from the Massachusetts Horticultural Society.

== 1892 Alipore Canna Collection ==
The Agri Horticultural Society of India, located in Kolkata, India, firstly under the Secretaryship of Percy Lancaster in 1892 and later that of his son Sydney Percy-Lancaster, raised the Alipore Canna Collection, which dominated canna throughout that continent. Over 100 new varieties are known to have been raised by the society during that period, as well as importing the latest favourites from Europe and later from the USA.

== 1896 Luther Burbank ==
Mr Luther Burbank was a celebrated horticulturist when in 1896 he released his first two Canna cultivars, C. ‘Tarrytown’ and C. ‘Burbank’. He is reputed to be the first to recognise and name the C. 'Roi Humbert' mutation, which he named as C. 'Yellow King Humbert'.

His known cultivars were all of the type found in the Italian Group of Cannas.

== 1900s Rozain-Boucharlat ==
In the early 20th century, the Rozain-Boucharlat establishments were prolific hybridists. Their nursery at Cuires-les-Lyon, France, was the origin of many canna cultivars. Their catalog of the year 1910 documented 110 canna varieties, many of them being their own creations.

One of their principal successes was the obtaining of a pure pink colour which didn't exist at that time (only pale pink and salmon pink existed). The obtaining of these cultivars C. ‘Francis Berthie’ and C. ‘Prince de Galles’ encouraged them to try for a purer colour. In 1922, the cultivar C. ‘Prince Charmant’ with its bright carmine pink colour brought the desired tone to the collection. This is still a popular cultivar, found in many collections.

However, the improvements didn't stop there and in 1930, the Rozain-Boucharlat's variety C. 'Centenaire de Rozain-Boucharlat' appeared in their list. This variety which is small, floriferous, with big spikes and carmine, lilac shaded flowers is still found at many horticulturists' and cities’ green spaces. It was released in celebration of the first 100 years of the company.

== 1960s Longwood Gardens ==
Longwood Gardens in the USA contributed a collection of Conservatory Group and Aquatic Group cultivars, originated by Dr Robert Armstrong the chief geneticist at Longwood Gardens, Pennsylvania, USA.

== 1980s Marcelle Sheppard ==
Although best known for her Crinum cultivars, over the years Mrs Marcelle Sheppard has also hybridized a number of winning Cannas. One of the most exciting to look at is C. 'Zulu Rouge' with its dark (almost brown-black) foliage and bright red flowers. Many of her cultivars were distributed over the years by Herb Kelly Jr.

== See also ==
- Canna
- List of Canna species
- List of Canna cultivars
