= Canna 'Yellow King Humbert' =

Flowering plant cultivar

- Genus: Canna
- Cultivar group: Italian Group
- Cultivar: 'Yellow King Humbert'

Canna 'Yellow King Humbert' Burbank is a medium sized Italian Group Canna cultivar; foliage green, but often variegated purple markings and occasionally whole leaves purple, oval shaped, spreading habit; oval stems, coloured green + purple; flower clusters are open, spotted, colours yellow with red spots, often large red markings and occasionally whole flowers red, staminodes are large; seed is sterile, pollen is sterile; rhizomes are long and thin, coloured white and purple; tillering is prolific.

This is the oldest known Canna chimera, the earliest research reference is Sonderegger Nursery Catalogue, United States, 1929. There is an early reference to Luther Burbank being the originator.

== Origins ==
The earliest reference to this cultivar is in a US Gardening catalogue of 1929. It was reputed to be a mutation of Canna 'Roi Humbert' (synonym C. 'King Humbert') and was confirmed to be such by Dr Khoshoo in his published papers. On rare occasions it has also been known to produce stems where the foliage is all dark and the flowers are all red. That is the source of Canna 'Red King Humbert', amongst others.

All main catalogue references until the early 1990s are consistent in their descriptions of an Italian Group chimera cultivar, yellow with red spots. However, after that period there was some confusion and it found itself being used as a synonym for C. 'Austria' and its description was also confused with C. 'Roma'.

== Synonyms ==
- Canna 'Anthony and Cleopatra' - name confined to Europe.
- Canna 'Cleopatra' - the name first appeared in US catalogs in the 1960s, not to be confused with C. 'Cleopatré' which is a Crozy Group cultivar from the 1890s.
- Canna 'Fusion' - name confined to eBay in USA.
- Canna 'Goldkrone' - confined to Europe.
- Canna 'Harlequin' - name appears to be confined to the USA.
- Canna 'Queen Helena' - name appears to be confined to the USA.
- Canna 'Queen of Italy' - name confined to India.
- Canna 'Spanish Emblem' - - name appears to be confined to the USA.
- Canna 'Striped Queen' - name confined to India.
- Canna 'Yellow Humbert' - first appeared in the 1990s, presumably as a shorthand for the correct name.

== Gallery ==
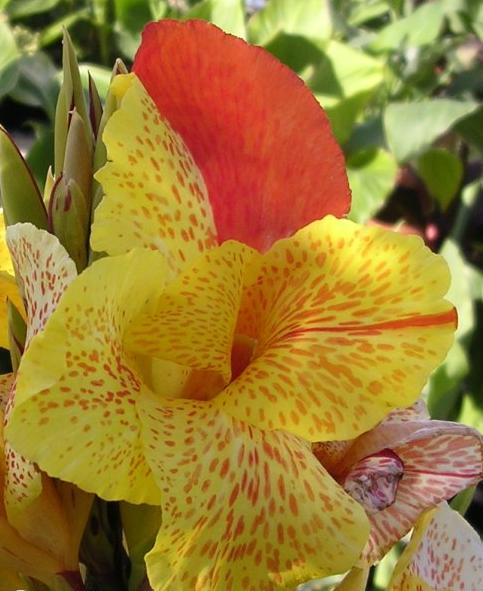

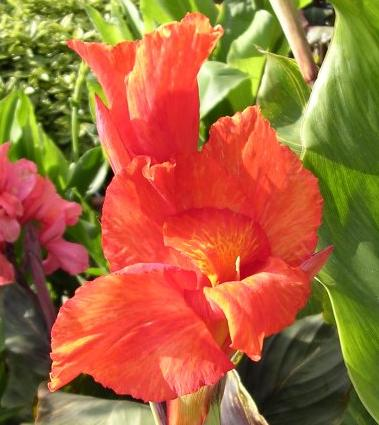

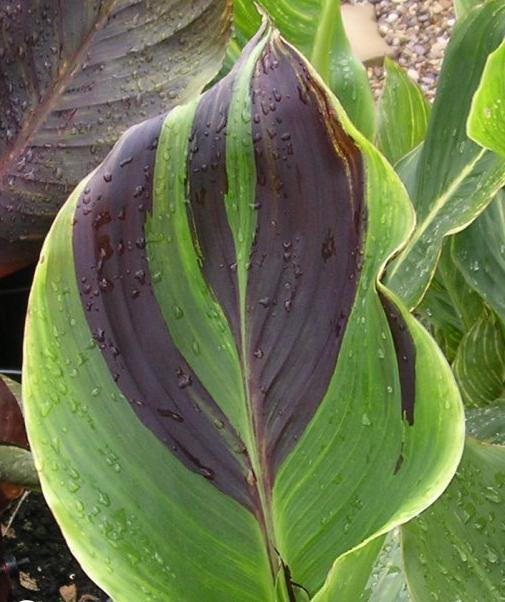

== Catalogue References ==
- Allen's Nurseries, Ohio, USA. Catalog 1939
- Allen's Nurseries, Ohio, USA. Catalog 1944
- Breck's Catalogue, USA, 1945
- Burgess Seed and Plant Co, USA, Catalogue 1939
- Burgess Seed and Plant Co, USA, Catalogue 1941
- Burpee, USA, Catalog 1946
- G.W. Park Seed Co, SC, USA, Catalog 1938
- G.W. Park Seed Co, SC, USA, Catalog 1939
- Henry Field's Catalogue, USA, 1969
- Inter-State Nurseries, Hamburg, Iowa, USA. Catalogue 1939
- Inter-State Nurseries, Hamburg, Iowa, USA. Catalogue 1950
- I.W. Scott Co., Pittsburgh. PA, USA, Catalogue 1939
- Montgomery Ward, USA, Catalogue 1949
- Montgomery Ward, USA, Catalogue 1953
- Montgomery Ward, USA, Catalogue 1955
- Montgomery Ward, USA, Catalogue 1961
- Montgomery Ward, USA, Catalogue 1964
- Naughton Farms, Waxahachie, Texas, USA. Catalogue 1945
- Olds' Seeds Catalogue, USA, 1947
- Peter Henderson & Co, Catalogue, USA, 1937
- Sears Garden Book, USA, 1951
- Sonderegger Catalogue, USA, 1929
- Westover Nursery, Clayton, USA. Catalog 1939

== See also ==
- Canna
- Canna 'Roi Humbert'
- List of Canna cultivars
- List of Canna hybridists
- List of Canna species
