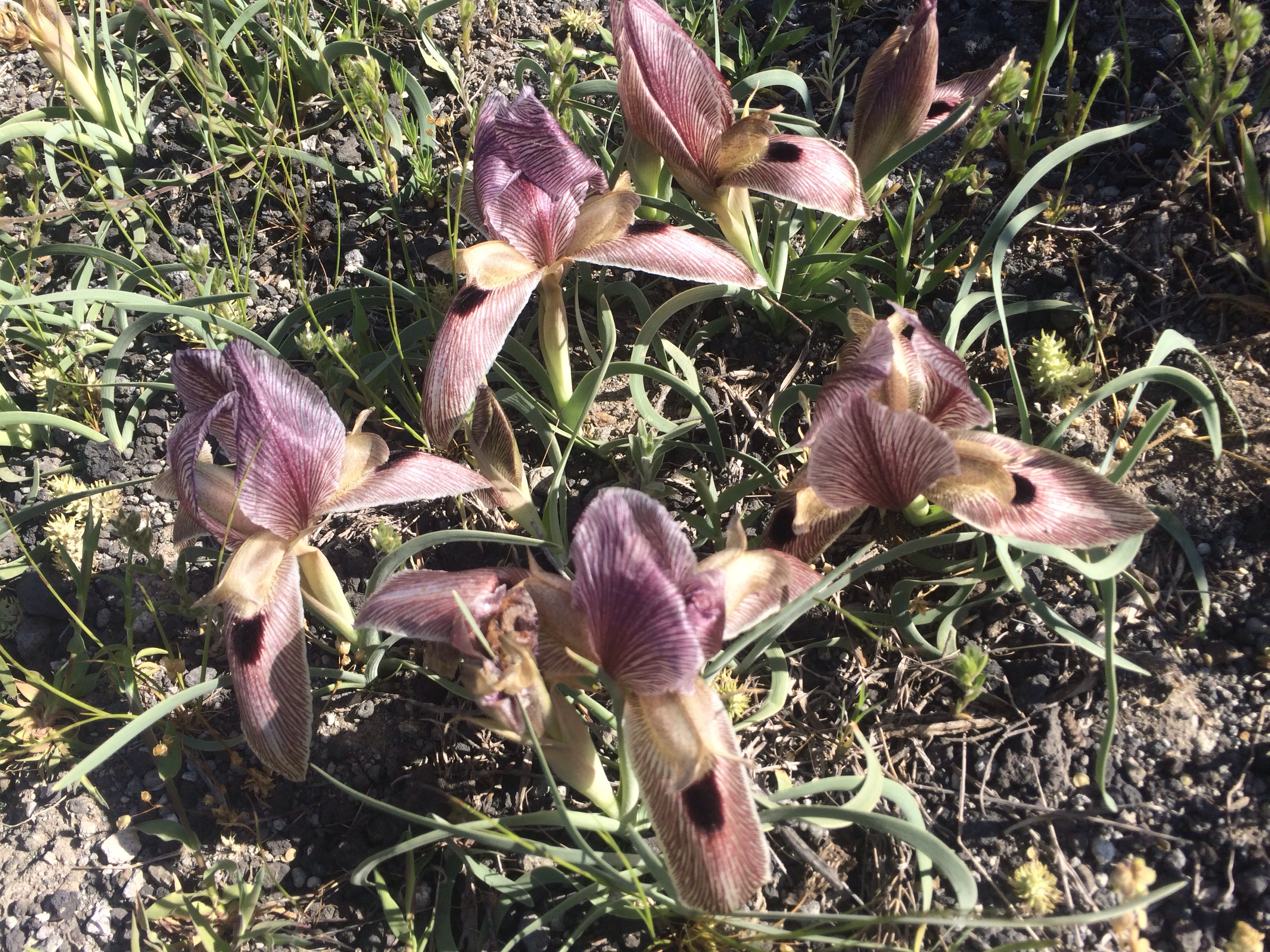
- In Konya, Turkey

Scientific classification
- Kingdom: Plantae
- Clade: Tracheophytes
- Clade: Angiosperms
- Clade: Monocots
- Order: Asparagales
- Family: Iridaceae
- Genus: Iris
- Species: I. sprengeri

Binomial name
- Iris sprengeri Siehe

Synonyms
- Iris elisabethae Siehe; Iris ewbankiana var. elisabethae (Siehe) Dykes

= Iris sprengeri =

Species of plant

Iris sprengeri is a species in the genus Iris, it is also in the subgenus of Iris and in the Oncocyclus section. It is from the mountain slopes of Turkey. It has large flowers which are white, silver-white or cream, with purple-red or reddish-brown veining and a golden yellow beard and a dark purple or deep purple-brown signal patch.

== Description ==
It has a slender rhizome, which have long slender stolons. The rhizome and stolons form creeping plants, that can produce plant offshoots that can be a distance away from the parent plant. This ability is not shared by other Oncocyclus species plants.

It has 4–5 leaves which are falcate (sickle-shaped) and 0.3–0.5 cm (0.1–0.2 in) wide.

The plant is a dwarf-like species, it can reach up to between 6–15 cm (2–6 in) tall.

It blooms in April and May, or July. The flower can be up 10–12 cm (4–5 in) in diameter.

Like other irises, it has two pairs of petals: three large sepals (outer petals), known as the 'falls', and three inner, smaller petals (or tepals), known as the 'standards'. The falls are oblanceolate shaped and 5–5.6 cm (2–2 in) long and 2-2.5 cm wide. They have a slightly folded edges. They are white or cream coloured, with yellow spots and purplish-red, reddish-brown or purplish-brown veining. They can also have bright purple-red spots and veins, instead of yellow spots. In the middle of the falls, there is a blotch or signal patch which is large, dark purple, or deep purple-brown. Also on the falls is a narrow row of hairs, called the 'beard', which is cream, yellow, or golden yellow. yellow beard The standards are elliptic-oblanceolate shaped with a wavy toothed edge and 5.7–5.8 cm (2–2 in) long and 2.3–2.7 cm wide. They have a white, or silvery-white ground, with purplish-brown, or purplish-red and black veining.

It has style branches which are 2.5–3.5 cm (1–1 in) long and 1 cm wide, they are yellowish with brown spots, with short reflexed lobes. The bract and bracteole are 3.5–8 cm (1–3 in) long, with a perianth tube of 1-1.5 cm long.

After it has flowered, the plant produces an ellipsoid shaped seed capsule that is 3 cm x 1.5 cm.

=== Biochemistry ===
As most irises are diploid, having two sets of chromosomes. This can be used to identify hybrids and classification of groupings. It's chromosome count has not been published.

== Taxonomy ==
It was originally discovered in 1903 by German engineer businessman and plant collector Walter Siehe, in Asia-Minor (on the Taurus Mountains). He then described and published the name in The Gardeners' Chronicle Series 3, Vol.36 on page 50 in 1904. Siehe also published and described Iris elizabethae in 1903, it was recorded having larger flowers, and only found on Mount Hasan (Hasan Dagi) but the plant was later declared to be a synonym of Iris sprengeri.

The Latin specific epithet sprengeri is in honour of the German Nurseryman, Carl L. Sprenger, (1846-1917) for whom Tulipa sprengeri is also named.

It has been verified as Iris sprengeri by United States Department of Agriculture and the Agricultural Research Service on 4 March 2003, and is an accepted name by the RHS. It was last listed in the RHS Plant Finder in 2017.

== Distribution and habitat ==
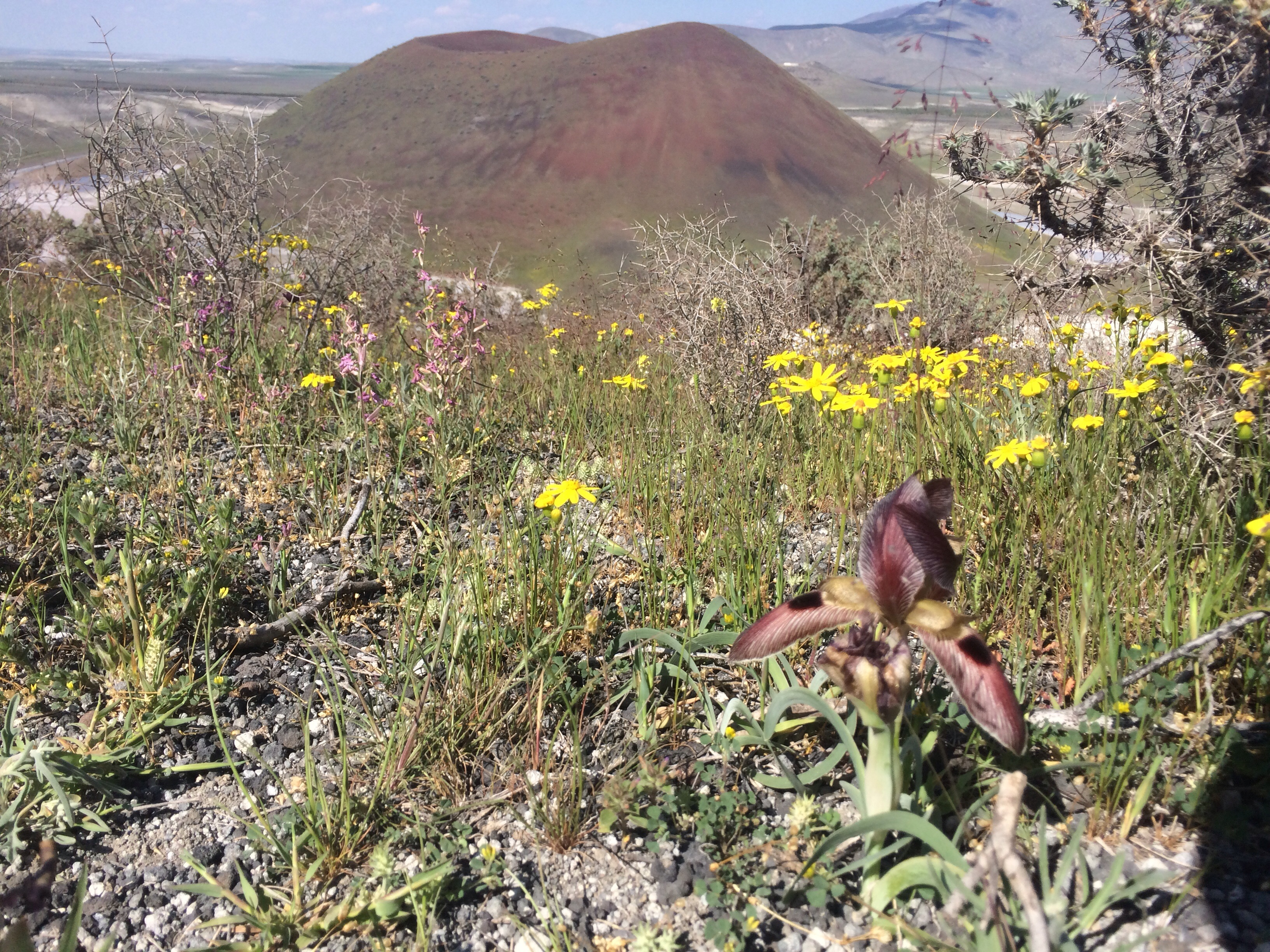
Iris sprengeri near Lake Meke in Konya Province, Turkey

It is native to temperate Asia.

=== Range ===
It is found in regions of Turkey, and in Iran.

Within Turkey it is found in Niğde and Konya provinces, and growing on Mount Hasan in Aksaray in Aksaray Province.

=== Habitat ===
It prefers to grow in the mountains, on steppes and screes, and unstable pumice slopes.

They can be found at an altitude of 1,000 to 2,000 m (3,300 to 6,600 ft) above sea level.

== Cultivation ==
Iris sprengeri can be grown in soils that have good drainage and are highin nutients, it needs to be dry through the summer after flowering. As similar to other Oncocyclus species irises it is more intolerant of water. A sign when to stop watering is when the leaves turn yellow.

It can also be grown in a pot or container, as long it is divided or repotted when the rhizomes start touching the edges of the pot or container.

== Toxicity ==
Like many other irises, most parts of the plant are poisonous (including the rhizome and leaves), if mistakenly ingested, it can cause stomach pains and vomiting. Also handling the plant may cause a skin irritation or an allergic reaction.

== Other sources ==
- Davis, P. H., ed. 1965–1988. Flora of Turkey and the east Aegean islands.
- Mathew, B. 1981. The Iris. 59.
