= Canna 'Florence Vaughan' =

Flowering plant cultivar

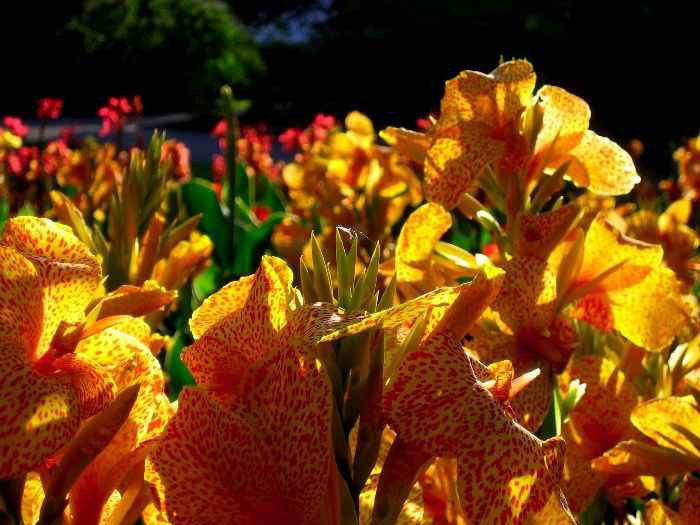
- Cultivated at the Royal Botanical Gardens, Melbourne
- Genus: Canna
- Cultivar group: 'Crozy Group'
- Cultivar: 'Florence Vaughan'
- Breeder: A. Crozy, Lyon, France in 1889
- Origin: France, 1892

Canna 'Florence Vaughan' is a medium Crozy Group canna cultivar; green foliage, oval shaped, branching habit; oval stems, coloured green; flowers are open, yellow with red spots, staminodes are medium size, edges regular, fully self-cleaning; fertile both ways, not self-pollinating or true to type, capsules globose; rhizomes are thick, up to 3 cm in diameter, coloured white; tillering is average. Introduced by A. Crozy, Lyon, France in 1892.

In the 1990s there was confusion over this heritage cultivar and an Italian Group cultivar with pale yellow background and orange blobs (correctly called C. 'Roma') was widely called by this name. Several other similar Italian Group cultivars were also given this name as a synonym, but examination of the evidence from early adverts and catalogues shows there is no grounds for confusing these cultivars with C. 'Florence Vaughan'.

== Synonyms ==
- Canna 'Florence Vaughn' - confined to USA, but actually refers to C. 'Roma'
- Canna 'Florence Waughn' - confined to EU, but actually refers to C. 'Roma'

== Horticultural catalogues ==
- Allen's Nurseries, Ohio, USA. Catalog 1944
- Sonderegger Catalogue, 1929
- The I.W. Scott Co., Pittsburgh. PA, USA, Catalogue 1939

== See also ==
- Canna
- List of Canna species
- List of Canna cultivars
