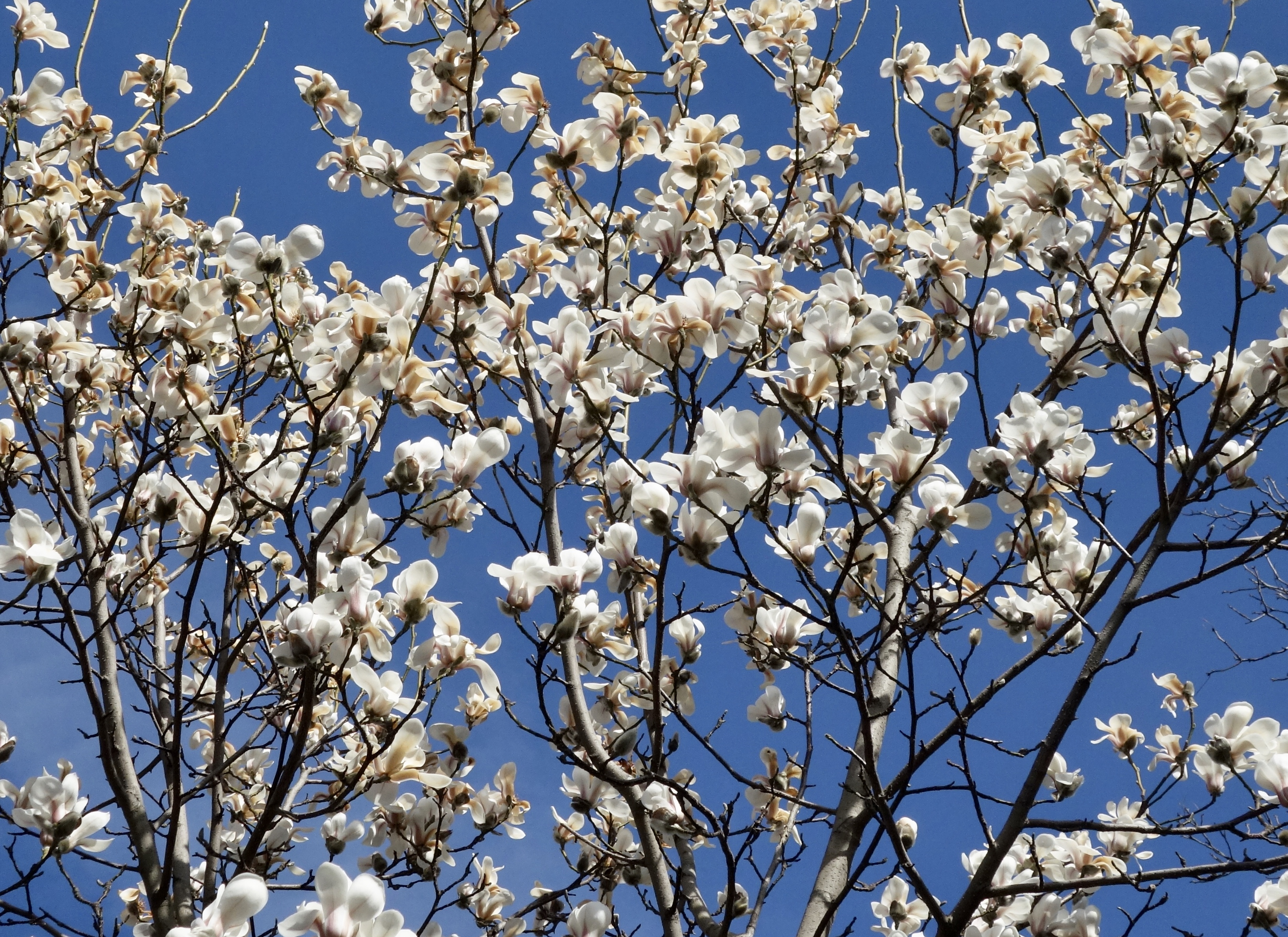
- Magnolia sprengeri flowering in the Arnold Arboretum of Harvard University

Conservation status
- Least Concern (IUCN 3.1)

Scientific classification
- Kingdom: Plantae
- Clade: Embryophytes
- Clade: Tracheophytes
- Clade: Spermatophytes
- Clade: Angiosperms
- Clade: Magnoliids
- Order: Magnoliales
- Family: Magnoliaceae
- Genus: Magnolia
- Subgenus: Magnolia subg. Yulania
- Section: Magnolia sect. Yulania
- Subsection: Magnolia subsect. Yulania
- Species: M. sprengeri

Binomial name
- Magnolia sprengeri Pamp.

= Magnolia sprengeri =

Sprenger's magnolia

Species of flowering plant

Magnolia sprengeri, or Sprenger's magnolia, is a species of Magnolia native to China, occurring in Gansu, Henan, Hubei, Hunan, Shaanxi, and Sichuan in forests or thickets at 1300–2400 m elevation. Named for Carl Ludwig Sprenger, a botanist of note.

== Description ==
It is a small deciduous tree, to 20 m in height with pale grayish brown to blackish brown, exfoliating bark. Young twigs are pale yellowish brown. The dark green leaves are obovate, 10–18 cm long and 4.5–10 cm broad, with a 1–3 cm petiole. Fragrant flowers appear before leaves, erect, cup-shaped, 15 cm wide, with 12-14 tepals that are white to rosy-red. The fruit is a cylindric aggregate of follicles 6–18 cm long.

== Fossil record ==
Fossils of Magnolia sprengeri have been described from the fossil flora of Kızılcahamam district in Turkey, which is of early Pliocene age.

== Cultivation ==
It is grown as an ornamental tree for its flowers. Several cultivars have been named, including 'Diva', 'Lanhydrock', and 'Wakehurst'. The cultivars 'Burncoose', 'Copeland Court', and 'Eric Savill' have all won the Royal Horticultural Society's Award of Garden Merit.

The species and its cultivars are hardy to roughly USDA hardiness zone 6. A number of hybrids with other Magnolias have also been developed.

== Gallery ==
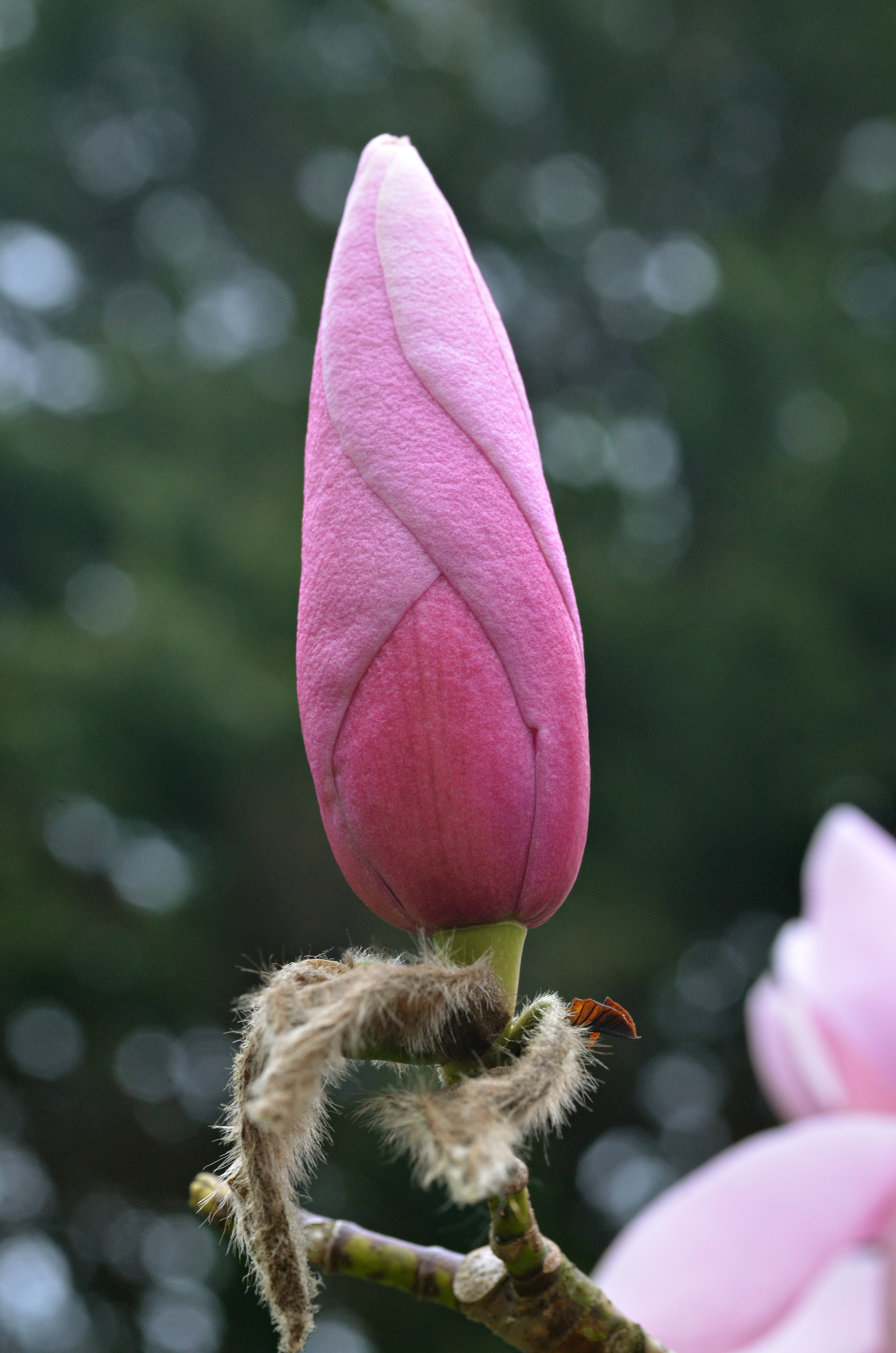
'Diva' Bud

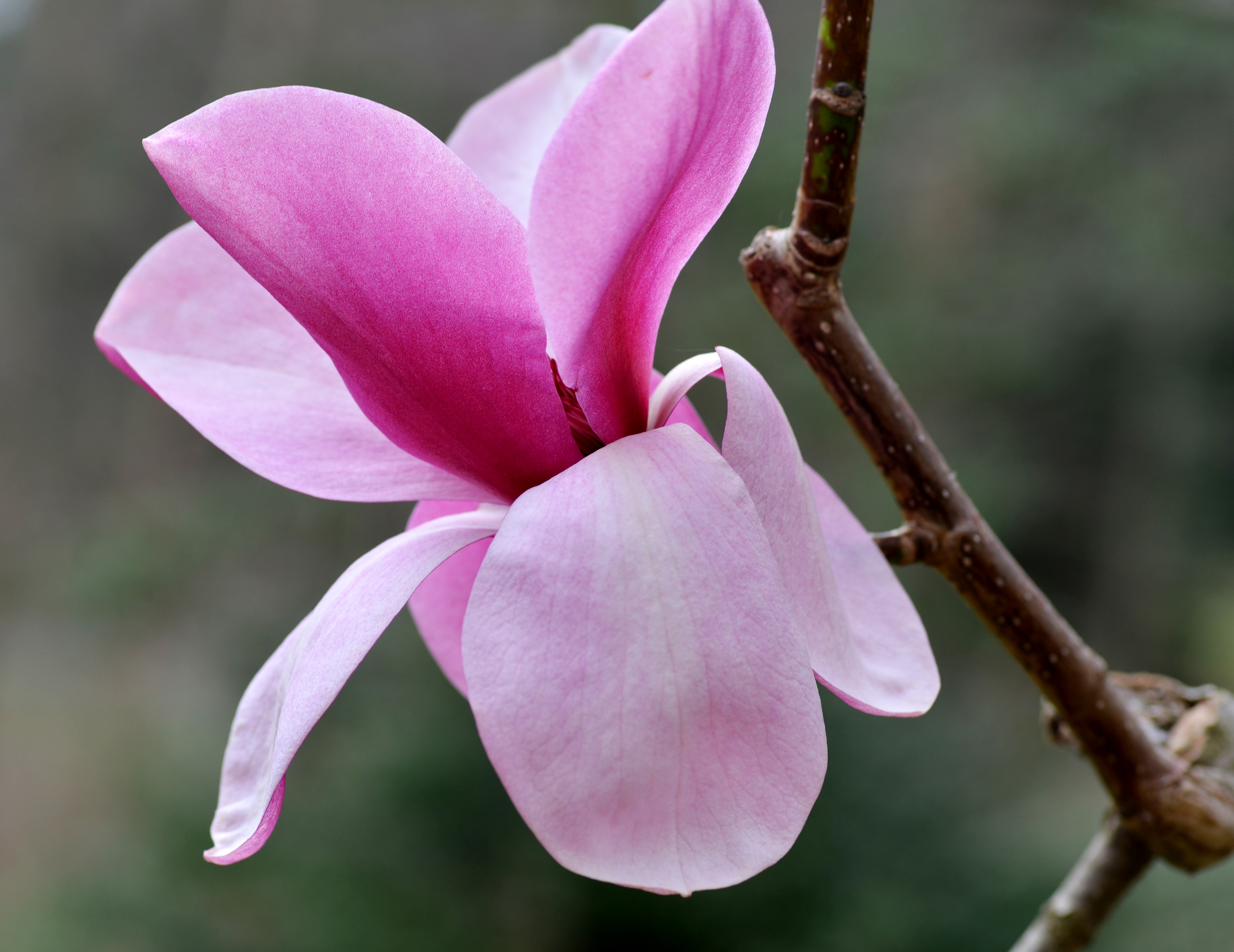
'Diva' Flower

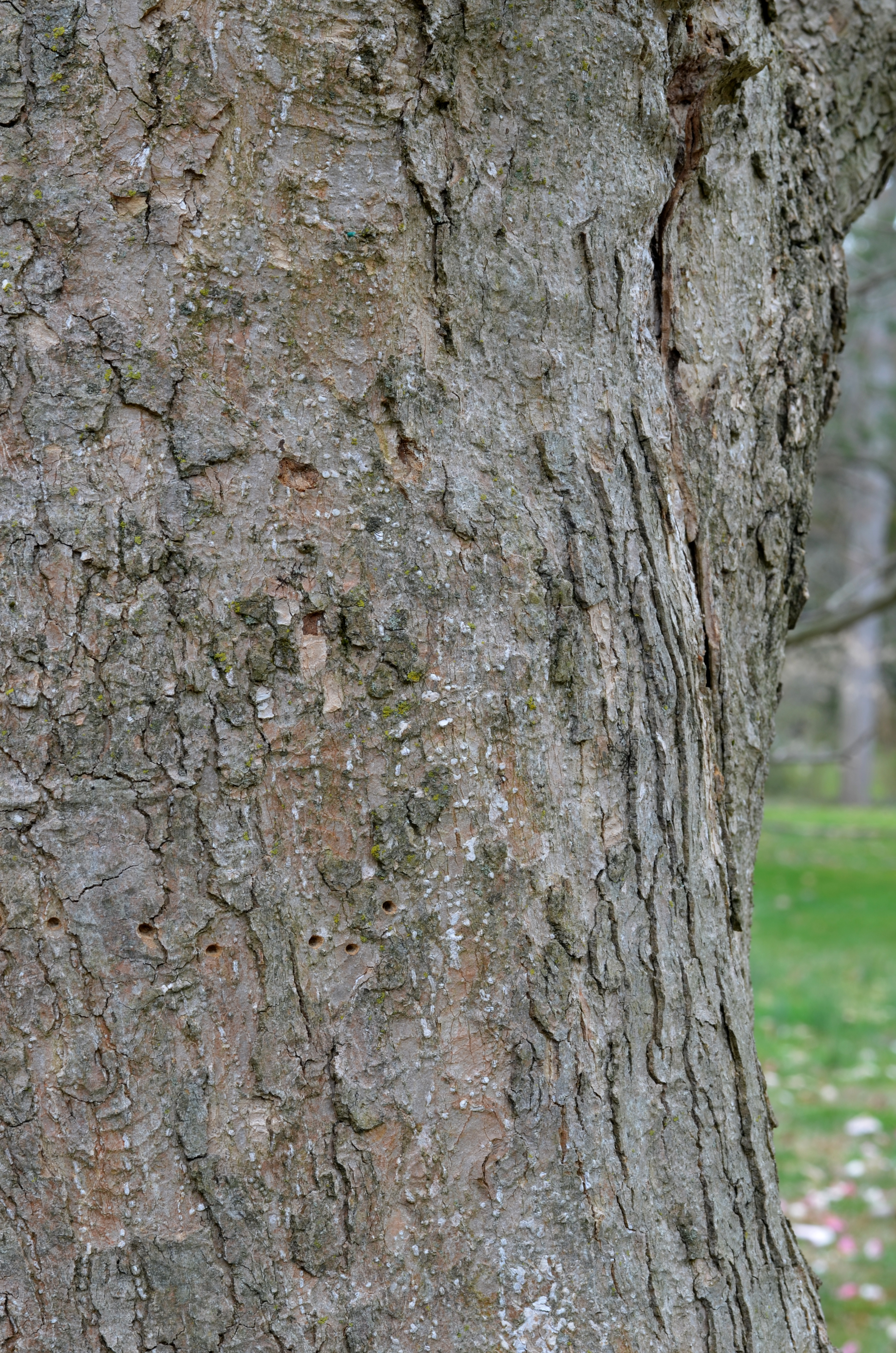
Trunk bark with woodpecker holes

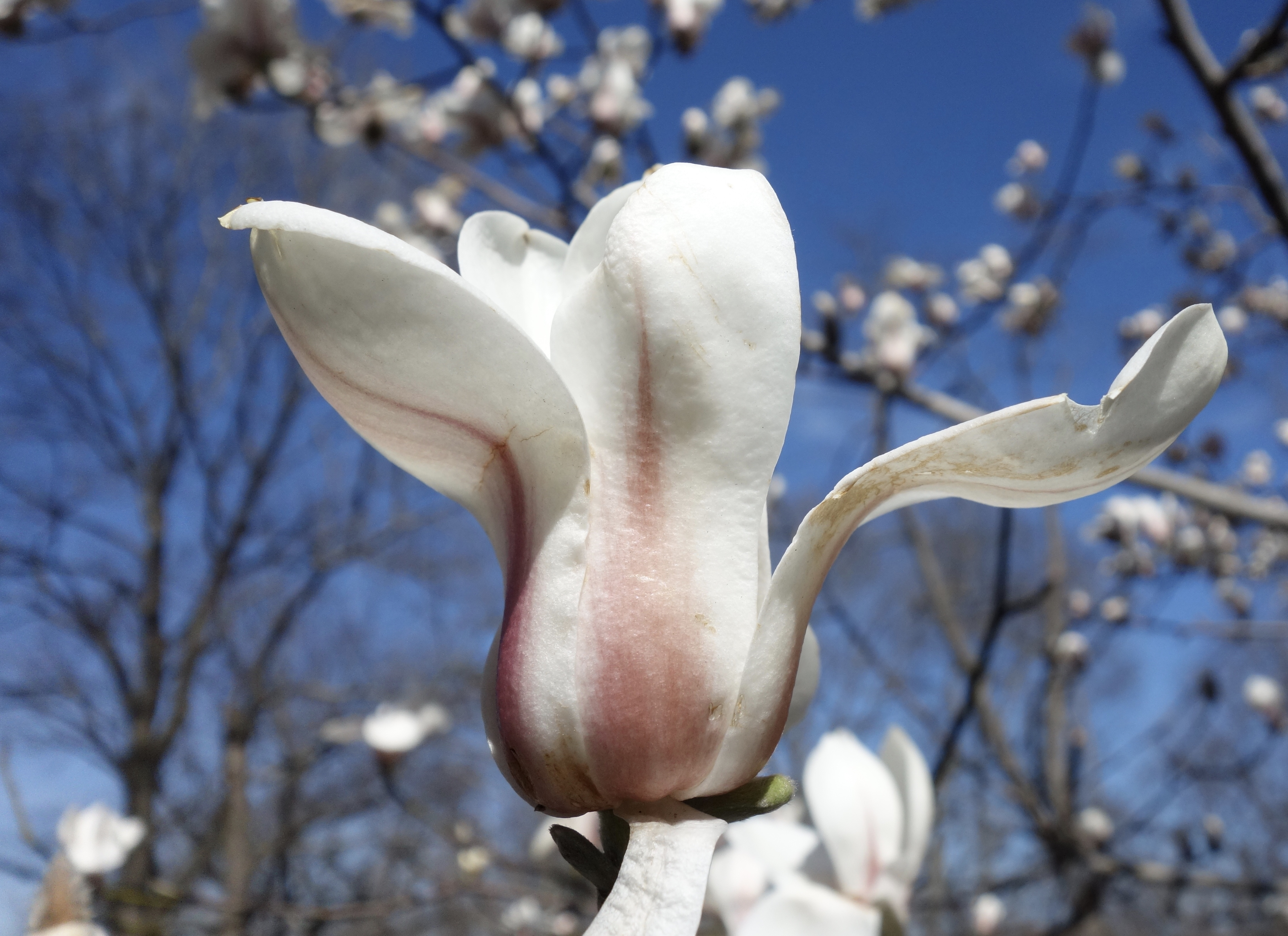
M. sprengeri flower, Arnold Arboretum of Harvard University, accession #228-2005*A.
