= Canna 'Austria' =

Flowering plant cultivar

- Genus: Canna
- Cultivar group: Italian Group
- Cultivar: 'Austria'

Canna 'Austria' is a medium sized Italian Group Canna cultivar with green foliage, oblong shaped, upright habit; oval stems, coloured green; flowers are cupped, self-coloured yellow, throat orange-red spots on yellow, staminodes are large; seed is sterile, pollen is low fertile; rhizomes are long and thin, coloured white; tillering is prolific. Introduced by C. Sprenger, Dammann & Co., Naples, Italy, EU in 1893.

Announced along with C. 'Italia', and caused much interest as their large flowers were considered to be a major breakthrough.

The breeding is Canna 'Madame Crozy' x Canna flaccida 'Le Roi'.

== Gallery ==
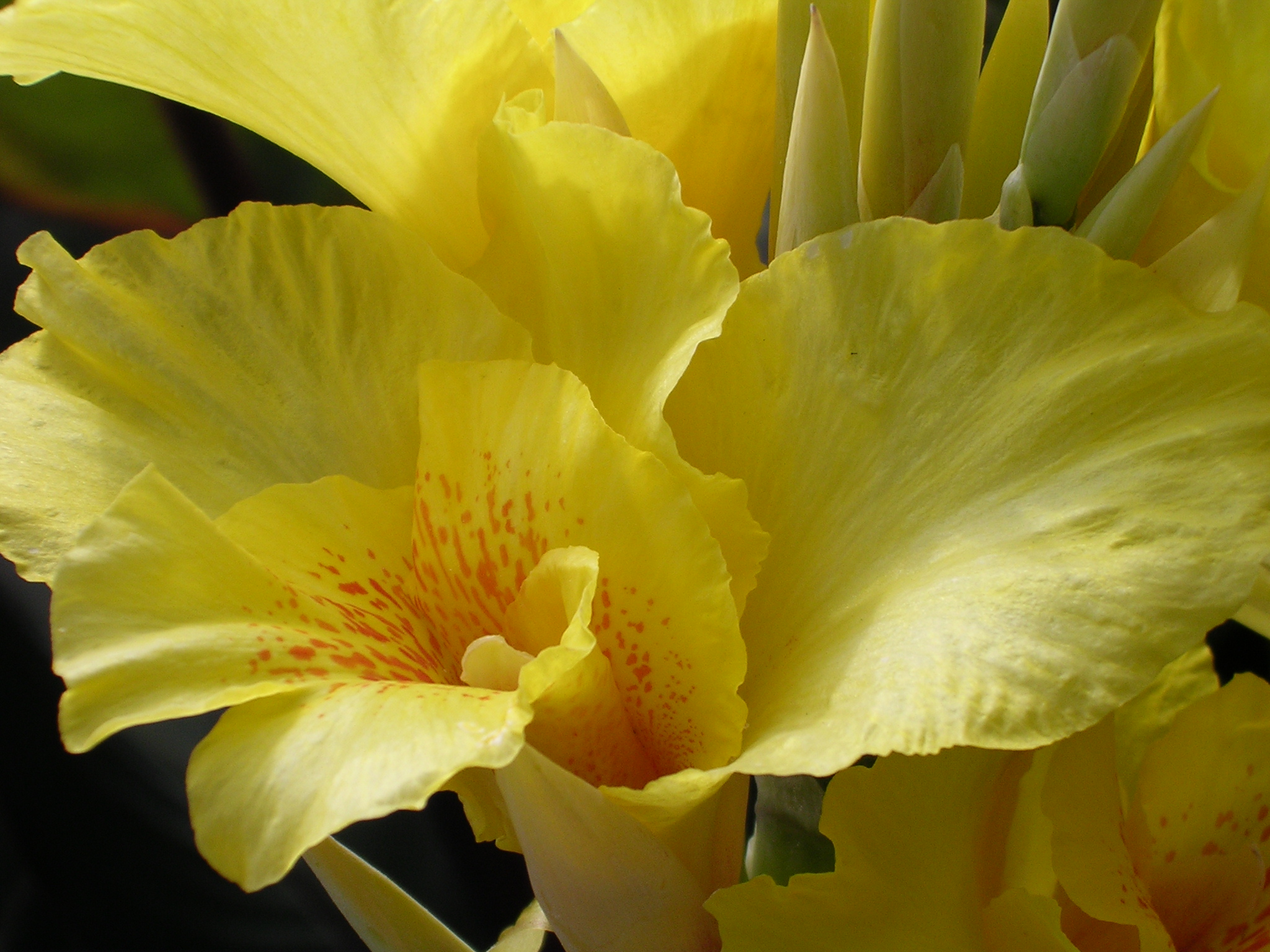

== Synonyms ==
- Canna 'Austra'
- Canna 'Canary Bird'
- Canna 'King Midas'
- Canna 'Lemon Zest'
- Canna 'Richard Wallace' - a totally different Crozy Group cultivar.
- Canna 'Souvenir de Jeanne'

== See also ==
- Canna
- List of Canna species
- List of Canna cultivars
