= Percy Lancaster =

Percy Lancaster (1878, Manchester,–1951) was an English landscape artist.

Following some initial training as an architect, he attended Southport School of Art and developed his career as an artist.
