= Agri-Horticultural Society of India =

Horticultural society and flower garden in Kolkata, India

Coordinates: 22.5282°N 88.3333°E

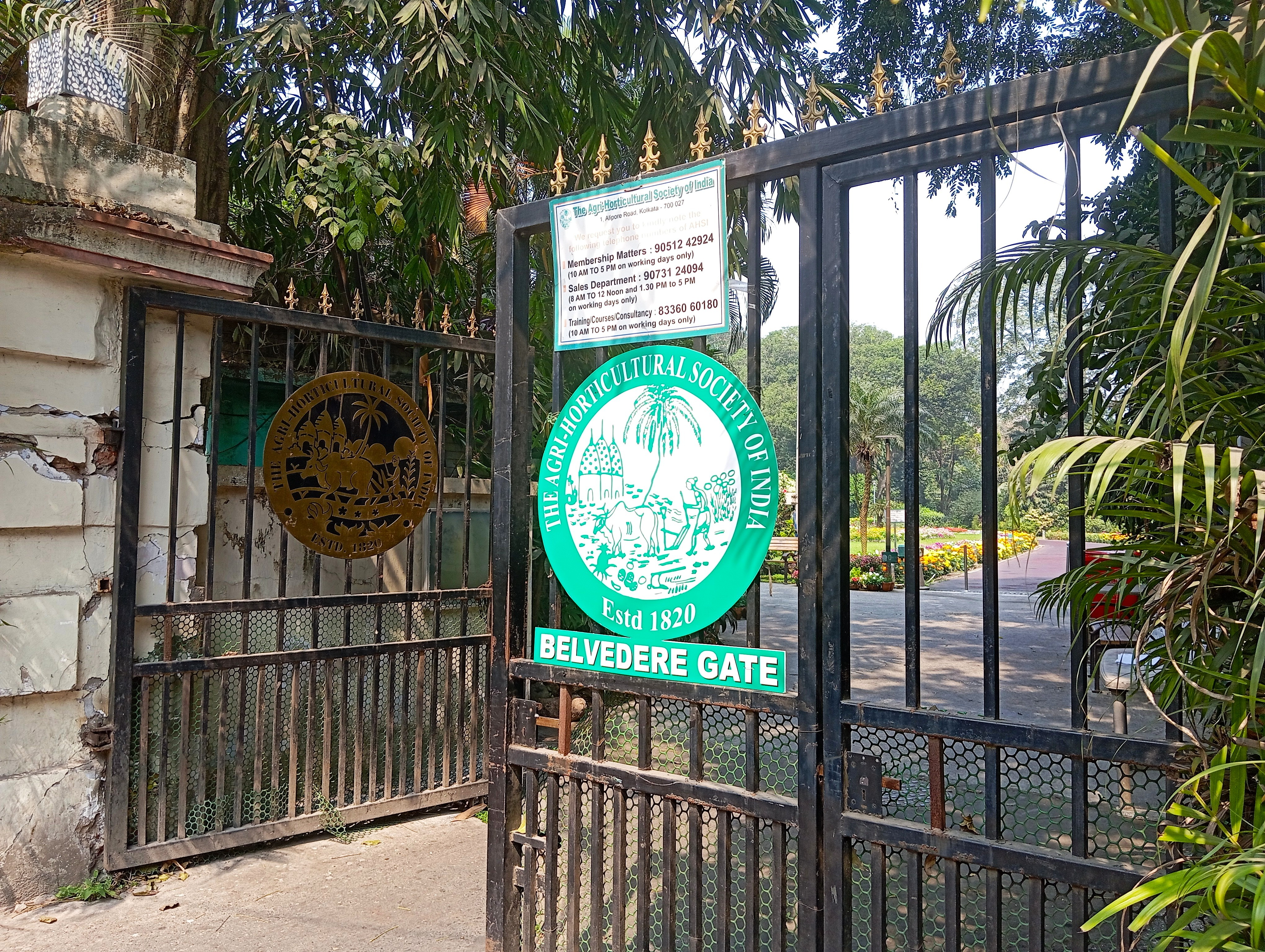
Entrance gate to The Agri-Horticultural Society of India, Alipore, Kolkata.

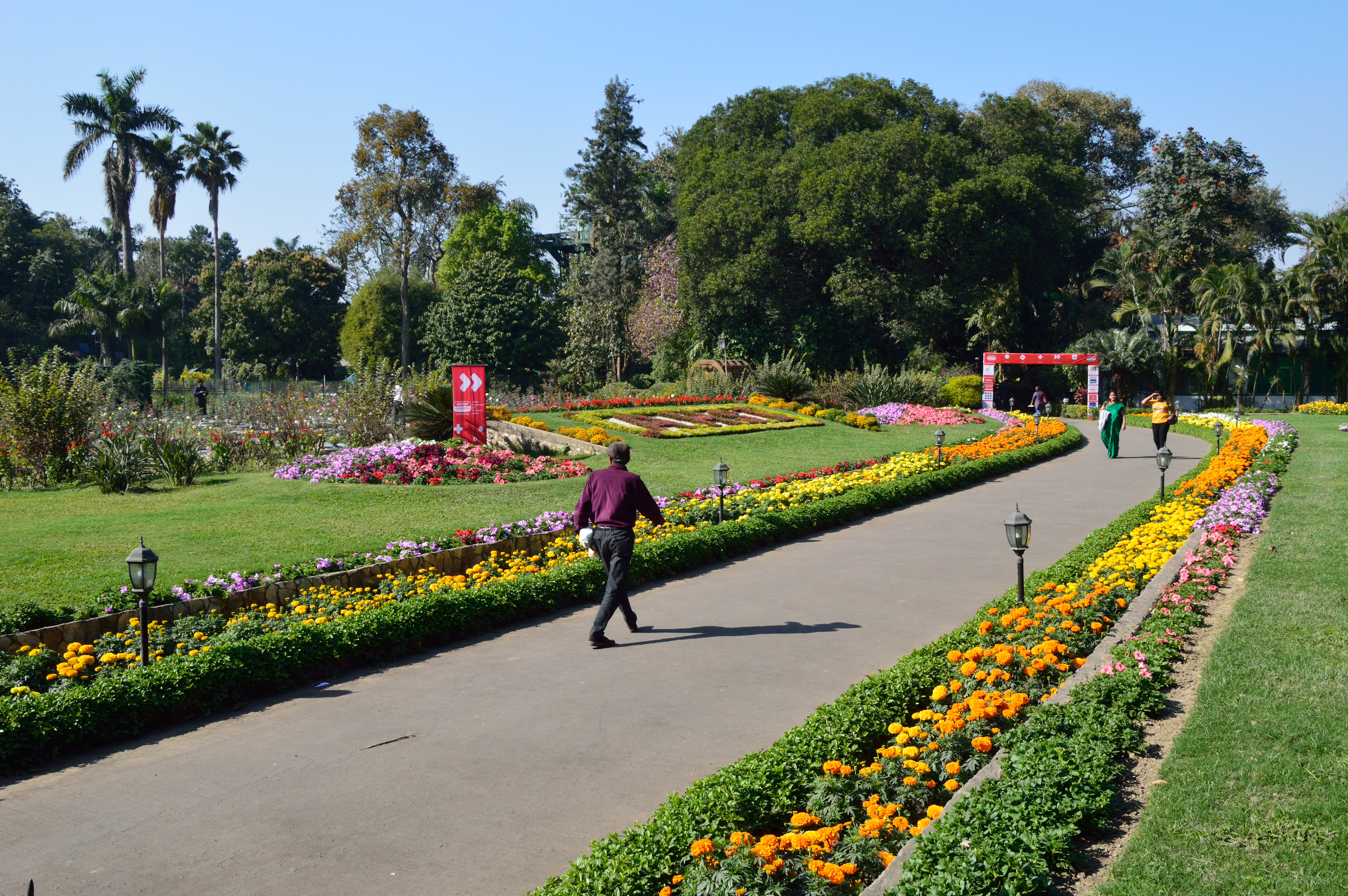
Garden of The Agri-Horticultural Society of India, Kolkata.

The Agri-Horticultural Society of India was founded in 1820 by William Carey on Alipore Road, Kolkata. It has a flower garden, greenhouses, a research laboratory, and a library. Originally known as the Agricultural and Horticultural Society of India, it houses a massive collection of plants and flowers, and features a significant collection of botanical varieties, including Cannas, for which it has a long and distinguished tradition, with facilities for gardeners and plant/flower lovers.

== Gallery ==
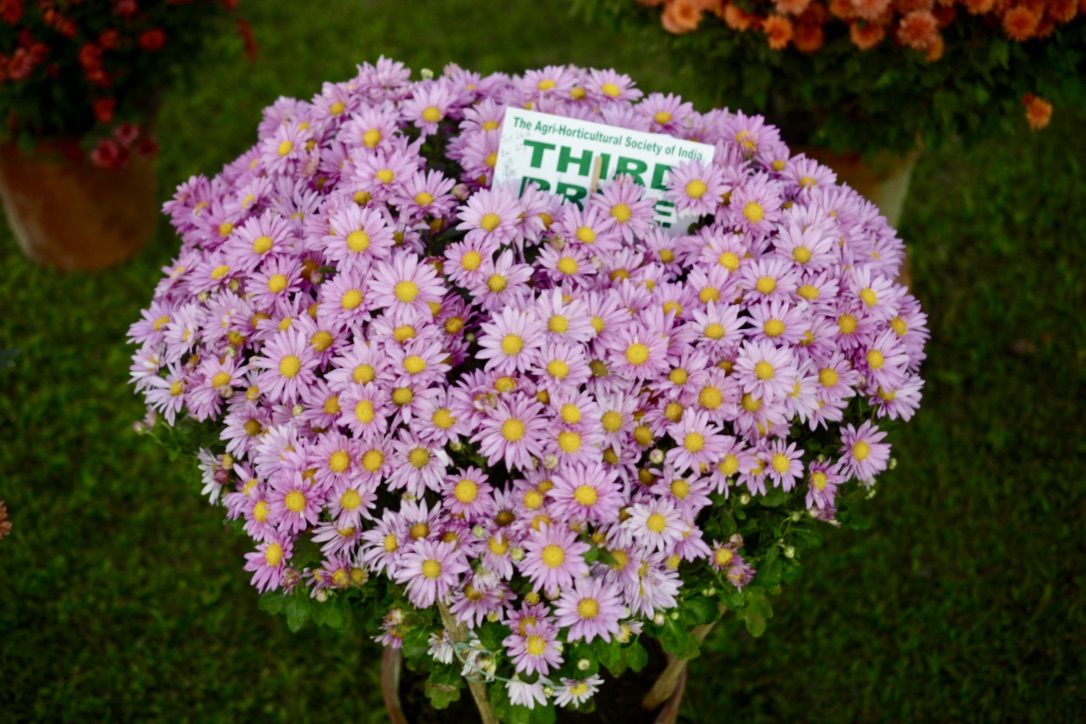
Flowers at Agri Horticultural Society of India

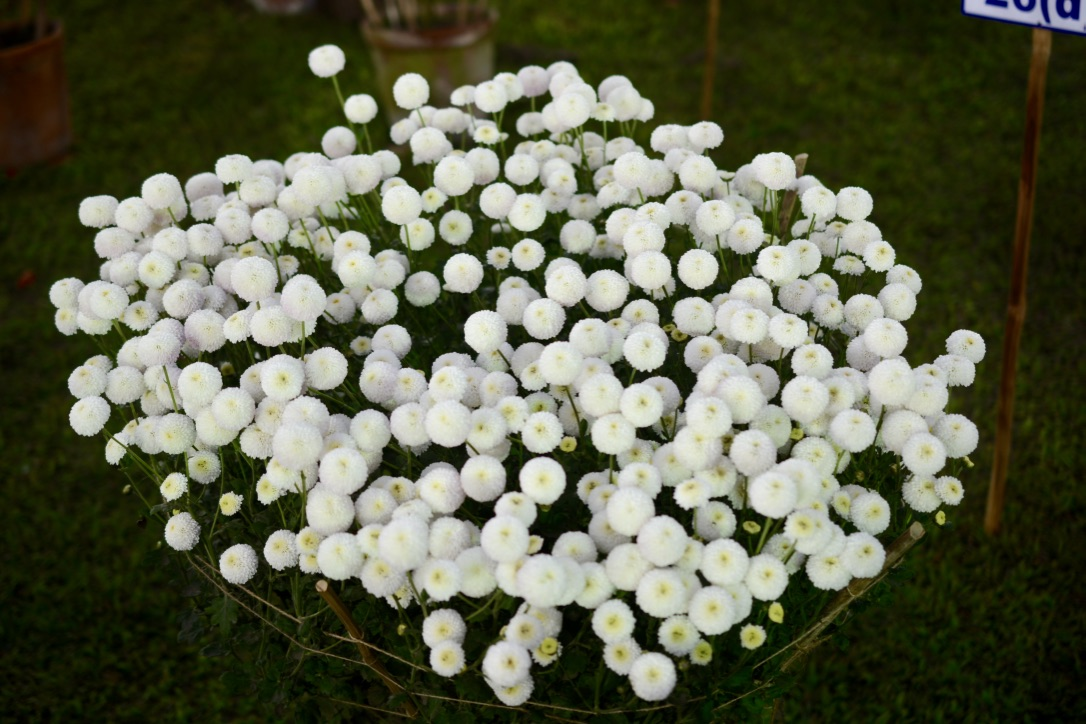
Flowers at the Winter Flower Show 2017.
