= Carl Ludwig Sprenger =

German botanist

- Born: 30 November 1846; Güstrow, Mecklenburg, Germany
- Died: 13 December 1917 (aged 71); Corfu, Greece
- Known for: Collected seeds for botanical gardens
- Scientific career
- Fields: Botany
- Author abbrev. (botany): Sprenger

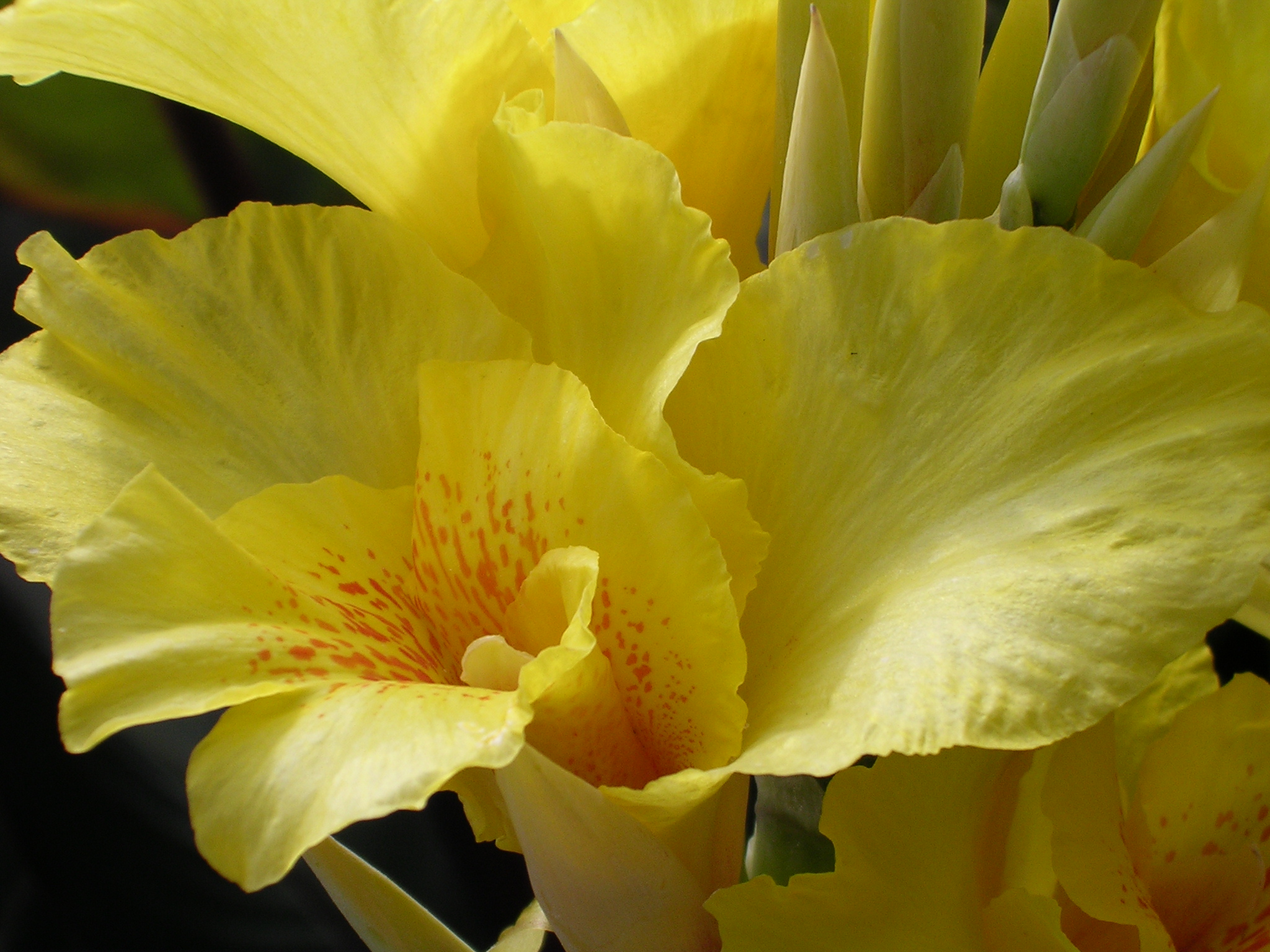
Canna Italian Group 'Austria', Sprenger 1893

Carl Ludwig Sprenger was a German botanist, born on 30 November 1846 at Güstrow, Mecklenburg and died 13 December 1917 on the island of Corfu (Kérkyra).

Sprenger lived in Naples from 1877 to 1907, and was a partner in the horticultural house of Dammann & Co. of San Giovanni a Teduccio, Naples, Italy. David Fairchild praised Sprenger, "a brilliant botanist who had established a nursery ... he was one of those real plantsmen who both know the names of plants and how to grow them ... He enthusiastically collected seeds for botanical gardens and freely gave of his knowledge to others ... The eruption of Vesuvius on 4 April 1906 buried his plants under volcanic ash, destroying hundreds of his best specimens."

In 1907, Kaiser Wilhelm (William II) purchased Achilleion, a palace in Corfu. Sprenger became supervisor of the Kaiser's garden. He was also so responsible for the building of the bridge that led to the beach. It was then named Kaiser's bridge.

Sprenger's life had no sound; Fairchild wrote that he was "very deaf". As a German national, he was imprisoned by the Serbs at the outbreak of the First World War, but after an intervention by the local administration of Corfu, they then let him go.

He stayed in Corfu until his death some years later. The man who surrounded himself with plants died on 13 December 1917.

Plants named after him include:

- Asparagus sprengeri, Sprenger's asparagus (now Asparagus aethiopicus), a weed native to South Africa.
- Magnolia sprengeri, Sprenger's magnolia, a species of magnolia native to China.
- Iris sprengeri, a species of iris native to Turkey

== Cultivars ==
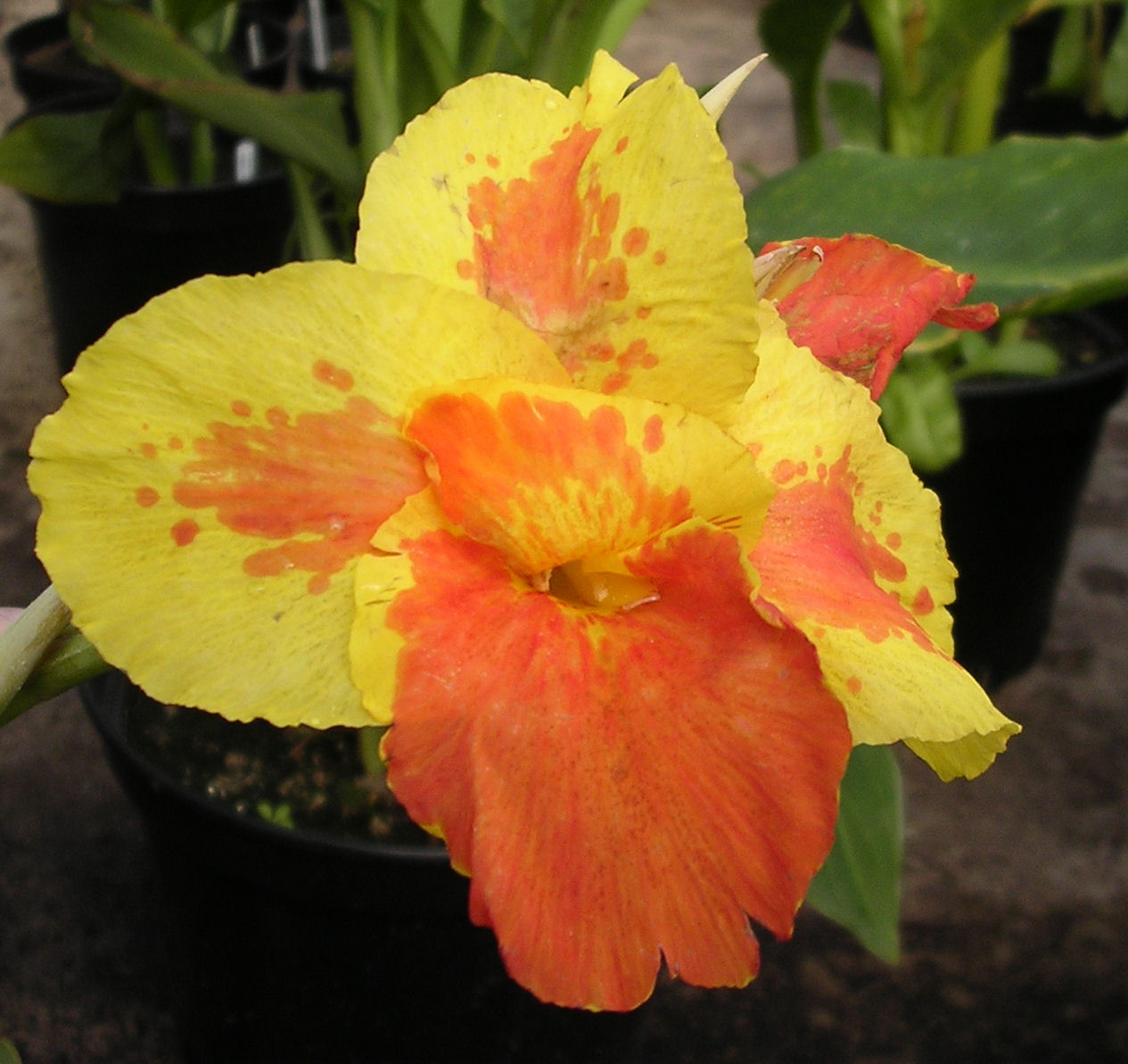
Canna Italian Group 'Italia', Sprenger 1893

Sprenger concluded that by constantly interbreeding the large flowered Crozy canna varieties nothing novel or more remarkable could be secured, and he therefore experimented with some new blood, employing for this purpose Canna flaccida, a species from the southern USA, of medium height and large flowers, with one specially developed petal-like staminode. The result was what became known as the 'orchid' cannas or the 'Italian' cannas, when in 1893 he introduced Canna 'Italia' and Canna 'Austria'. At the same time, Luther Burbank in the USA was pursuing a similar approach, the results of which were introduced some two years later than Sprenger's introductions.

Sprenger is credited with many Italian Group introductions and also released many new Crozy Group cultivars.

Other cultivars he developed include many Yucca hybrids in the years from 1897 to 1907.

== See also ==
- List of Canna cultivars
- List of Canna species
- List of Canna hybridists
