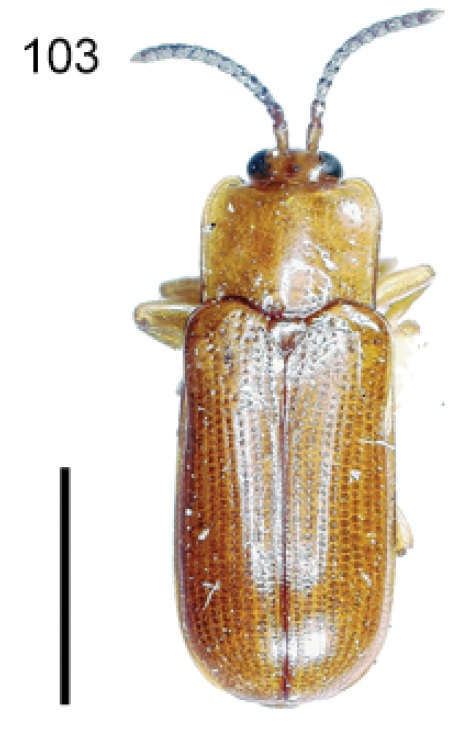

Scientific classification
- Kingdom: Animalia
- Phylum: Arthropoda
- Class: Insecta
- Order: Coleoptera
- Suborder: Polyphaga
- Infraorder: Cucujiformia
- Family: Chrysomelidae
- Genus: Cephaloleia
- Species: C. congener

Binomial name
- Cephaloleia congener Baly, 1885

= Cephaloleia congener =

Species of beetle

Cephaloleia congener is a species of beetle of the family Chrysomelidae. It is found in Costa Rica, Guatemala, Nicaragua and Panama.

== Description ==
Adults reach a length of about 6.6–7.4 mm. Adults are light reddish-brown, with the antennae (except the basal antennomere) and eyes darker.

== Biology ==
Adults have been collected from Heliconia latispatha, Heliconia tortuosa, Heliconia imbricata, Heliconia irrasa, Heliconia mathiasiae, Heliconia psittacorum, Heliconia pogonantha, Heliconia sarapiquensis, Heliconia wagneriana, Calathea crotalifera, Cephaloleia inocephala, Ischnosiphon inflatus and Musa velutina.
