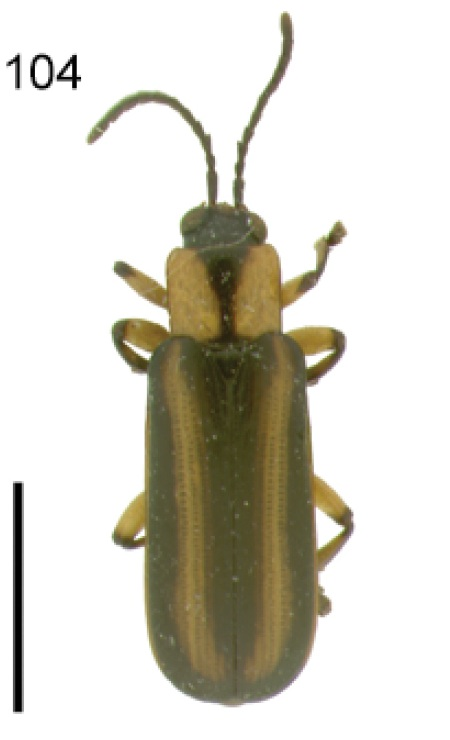

Scientific classification
- Kingdom: Animalia
- Phylum: Arthropoda
- Class: Insecta
- Order: Coleoptera
- Suborder: Polyphaga
- Infraorder: Cucujiformia
- Family: Chrysomelidae
- Genus: Cephaloleia
- Species: C. consanguinea

Binomial name
- Cephaloleia consanguinea Baly, 1885

= Cephaloleia consanguinea =

Species of beetle

Cephaloleia consanguinea is a species of beetle of the family Chrysomelidae. It is found in Belize, Costa Rica, Guatemala and Panama.

== Description ==
Adults reach a length of about 5.7–7 mm. The head, antennae and scutellum are black, while the pronotum is yellow with a medial black macula narrowing toward the base. The elytron is black with a medial yellow vitta, which begins at the humerus and goes to the apical one-fifth.

== Biology ==
Adults have been collected from Heliconia imbricata, Heliconia latispatha, Heliconia pogonantha, Heliconia mariae, Heliconia tortuosa, Heliconia bourgaeana, Heliconia collinsiana, Heliconia wagneriana, Heliconia longa, Heliconia nutans, Heliconia stilesii, Heliconia wilsonii, Calathea crotalifera, Cephaloleia guzmanioides and Musa ornata.
