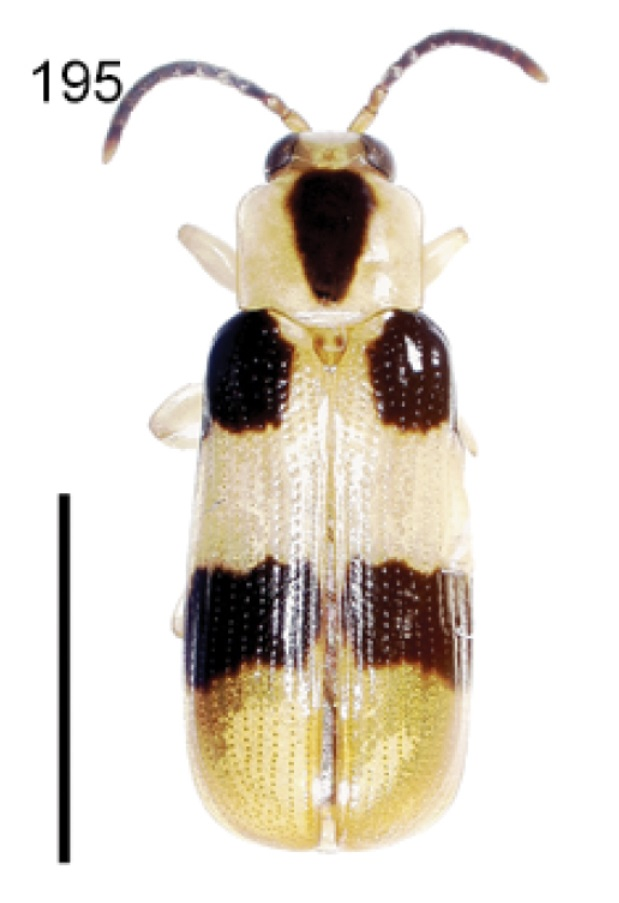

Scientific classification
- Kingdom: Animalia
- Phylum: Arthropoda
- Class: Insecta
- Order: Coleoptera
- Suborder: Polyphaga
- Infraorder: Cucujiformia
- Family: Chrysomelidae
- Genus: Cephaloleia
- Species: C. nigropicta

Binomial name
- Cephaloleia nigropicta Baly, 1885

= Cephaloleia nigropicta =

Species of beetle

Cephaloleia nigropicta is a species of beetle of the family Chrysomelidae. It is found in Costa Rica and Panama.

== Description ==
Adults reach a length of about 5.8–6.3 mm. The head is yellow, while the antennae are black, except for antennomere 1 or 1 and 2 which are yellow. The pronotum is yellow with a black triangular macula. The elytron is yellow with black humeral maculae and a black band.

== Biology ==
Adults have been collected on Heliconia species (including Heliconia tortuosa), Calathea crotalifera and Pleiostachya leiostachya.
