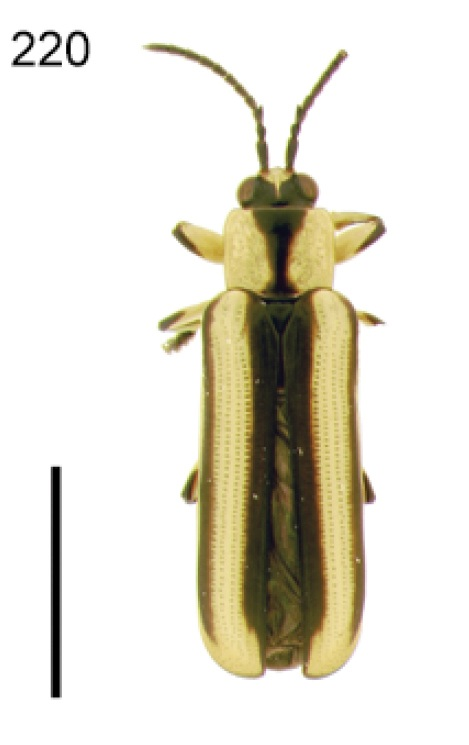

Scientific classification
- Kingdom: Animalia
- Phylum: Arthropoda
- Class: Insecta
- Order: Coleoptera
- Suborder: Polyphaga
- Infraorder: Cucujiformia
- Family: Chrysomelidae
- Genus: Cephaloleia
- Species: C. quadrilineata

Binomial name
- Cephaloleia quadrilineata Baly, 1885

= Cephaloleia quadrilineata =

Species of beetle

Cephaloleia quadrilineata is a species of beetle of the family Chrysomelidae. It is found in Costa Rica and Panama.

== Description ==
Adults reach a length of about 5.6–6.9 mm. The head, antennae and scutellum are black and the pronotum is yellow, sometimes with a black medial vitta. The elytron is black with variable yellow markings.

== Biology ==
Adults have been collected on Heliconia species, including Heliconia imbricata and Heliconia latispatha.
