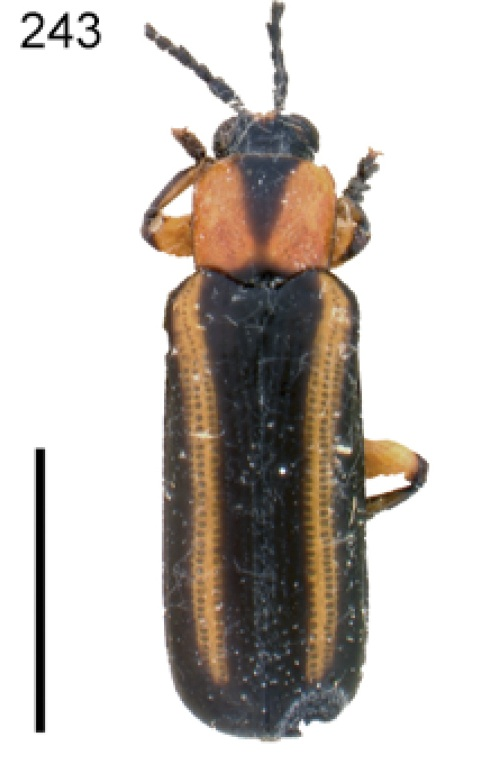

Scientific classification
- Kingdom: Animalia
- Phylum: Arthropoda
- Class: Insecta
- Order: Coleoptera
- Suborder: Polyphaga
- Infraorder: Cucujiformia
- Family: Chrysomelidae
- Genus: Cephaloleia
- Species: C. suaveola

Binomial name
- Cephaloleia suaveola Baly, 1885

= Cephaloleia suaveola =

Species of beetle

Cephaloleia suaveola is a species of beetle of the family Chrysomelidae. It is found in Mexico and Guatemala.

== Description ==
Adults reach a length of about 6.4–7.2 mm. The head, antennae and scutellum are black, while the pronotum is yellow with a small black macula on the anterior margin behind the head. The elytron is black with a thin yellow vitta from the base to the apical one-fifth covering interspace 5 and puncture row 6.

== Biology ==
Adults have been collected from Heliconia species.
