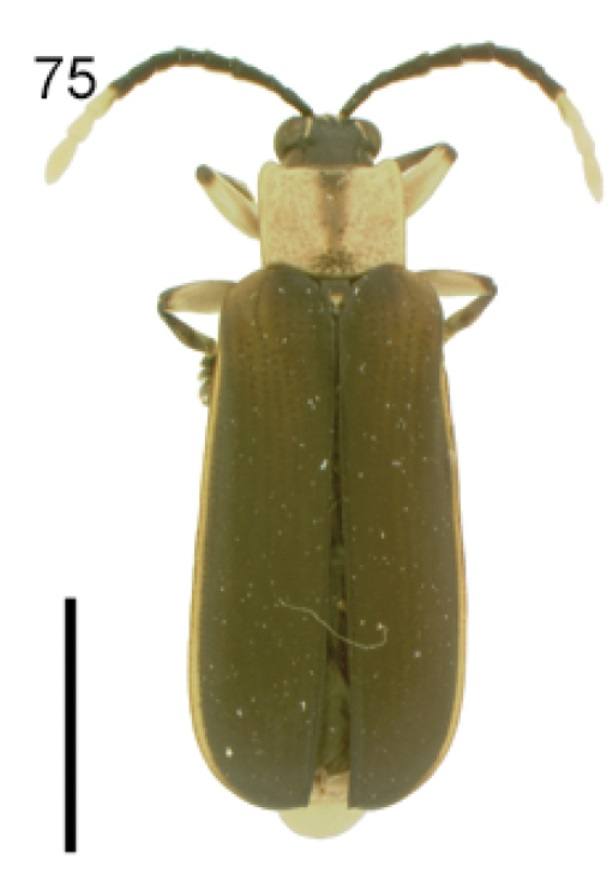

Scientific classification
- Kingdom: Animalia
- Phylum: Arthropoda
- Class: Insecta
- Order: Coleoptera
- Suborder: Polyphaga
- Infraorder: Cucujiformia
- Family: Chrysomelidae
- Genus: Cephaloleia
- Species: C. apicata

Binomial name
- Cephaloleia apicata Uhmann, 1930

= Cephaloleia apicata =

Species of beetle

Cephaloleia apicata is a species of beetle of the family Chrysomelidae. It is found in Costa Rica and Panama.

== Description ==
Adults reach a length of about 7.4–10 mm. Adults are hirsute, with the head and most of elytron black. Antennomeres 1–8 are black, while 9–11 may be yellow, black or with the apex of 11 yellow. The pronotum (some specimens with a broad black medial longitudinal vitta) and lateral margin of the elytron are yellow.

== Biology ==
They have been recorded feeding on Heliconia species.
