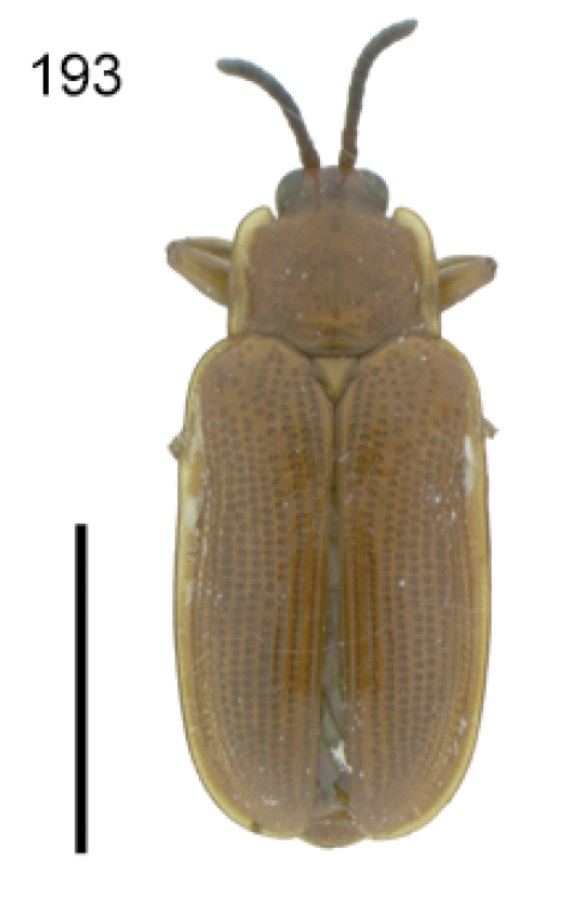

Scientific classification
- Kingdom: Animalia
- Phylum: Arthropoda
- Clade: Pancrustacea
- Class: Insecta
- Order: Coleoptera
- Suborder: Polyphaga
- Infraorder: Cucujiformia
- Family: Chrysomelidae
- Genus: Cephaloleia
- Species: C. nigricornis

Binomial name
- Cephaloleia nigricornis (Fabricius, 1792)

Synonyms
- Hispa nigricornis Fabricius, 1792

= Cephaloleia nigricornis =

Species of beetle

Cephaloleia nigricornis is a species of beetle of the family Chrysomelidae. It is found in Bolivia, Brazil, Colombia, Costa Rica, Ecuador, French Guiana, Guatemala, Honduras, Mexico, Panama, Peru and Venezuela.

== Description ==
Adults reach a length of about 5.6–6.4 mm. Adults are reddish-brown, with the eyes and antennomeres 4–11 darker.

== Biology ==
Adults have been collected on Heliconia species.
