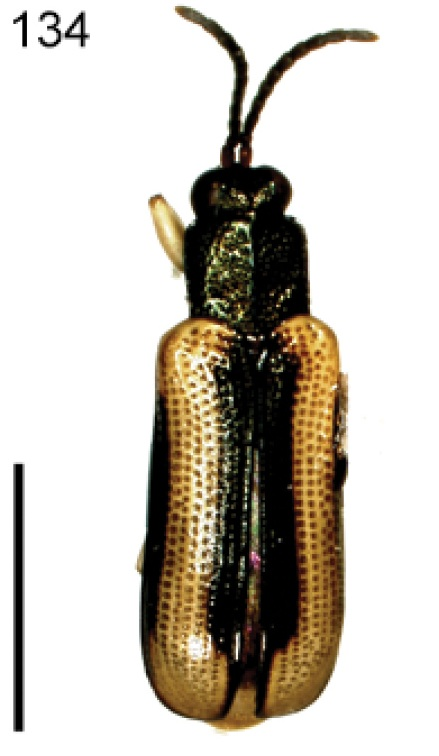

Scientific classification
- Kingdom: Animalia
- Phylum: Arthropoda
- Clade: Pancrustacea
- Class: Insecta
- Order: Coleoptera
- Suborder: Polyphaga
- Infraorder: Cucujiformia
- Family: Chrysomelidae
- Genus: Cephaloleia
- Species: C. eumorpha

Binomial name
- Cephaloleia eumorpha Staines, 1996

= Cephaloleia eumorpha =

Species of beetle

Cephaloleia eumorpha is a species of rolled-leaf beetle in the family Chrysomelidae. It is found in Panama.

== Description ==
Adults reach a length of about 5.6–6.4 mm. Adults are metallic green, the elytron with a creamy white vitta.

== Biology ==
The recorded host plants are Heliconia species.
