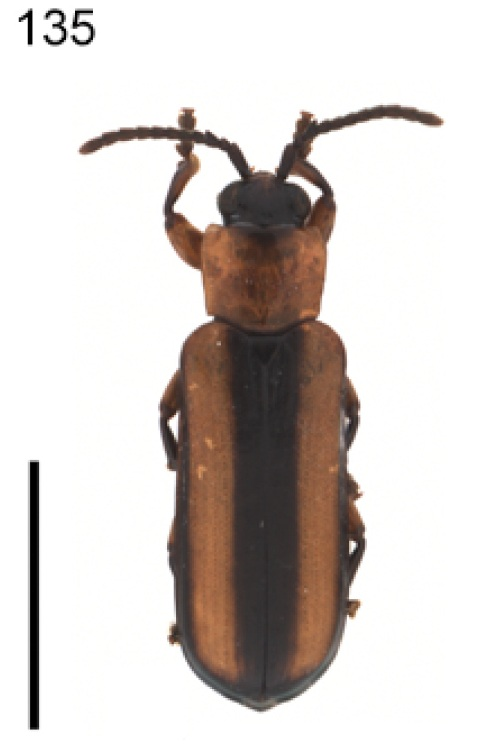

Scientific classification
- Kingdom: Animalia
- Phylum: Arthropoda
- Class: Insecta
- Order: Coleoptera
- Suborder: Polyphaga
- Infraorder: Cucujiformia
- Family: Chrysomelidae
- Genus: Cephaloleia
- Species: C. eximia

Binomial name
- Cephaloleia eximia Baly, 1858

= Cephaloleia eximia =

Species of beetle

Cephaloleia eximia is a species of beetle of the family Chrysomelidae. It is found in French Guiana and Brazil (Amazonas).

== Description ==
Adults reach a length of about 4.6–6 mm. Adults are black, while the pronotum is yellowish with a large apical macula and a smaller basal macula. The elytron has a yellow narrow marginal line just below the middle and a yellow longitudinal vitta on the disc. The legs are yellowish.

== Biology ==
Adults have been collected feeding on Heliconia psittacorum.
