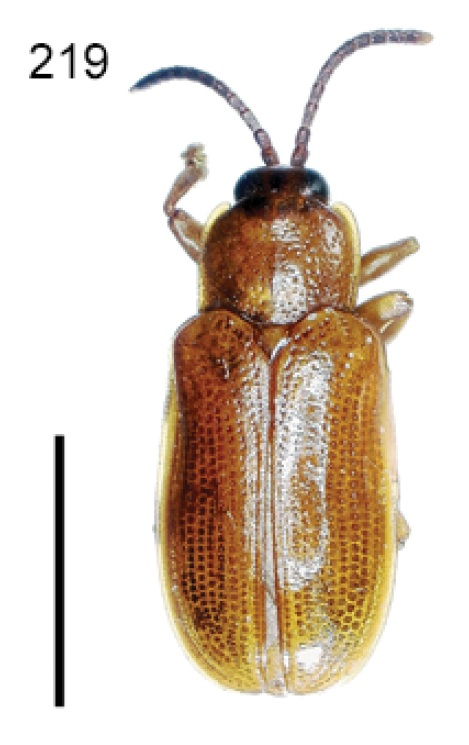

Scientific classification
- Kingdom: Animalia
- Phylum: Arthropoda
- Class: Insecta
- Order: Coleoptera
- Suborder: Polyphaga
- Infraorder: Cucujiformia
- Family: Chrysomelidae
- Genus: Cephaloleia
- Species: C. puncticollis

Binomial name
- Cephaloleia puncticollis Baly, 1885

= Cephaloleia puncticollis =

Species of beetle

Cephaloleia puncticollis is a species of beetle of the family Chrysomelidae. It is found in Costa Rica, Nicaragua and Panama.

== Description ==
Adults reach a length of about 5–5.9 mm. Adults are reddish-brown, with the eyes and antennae darker.

== Biology ==
The recorded host plants are Calathea insignis and Heliconia imbricata and adults have been collected on Heliconia latispatha.
