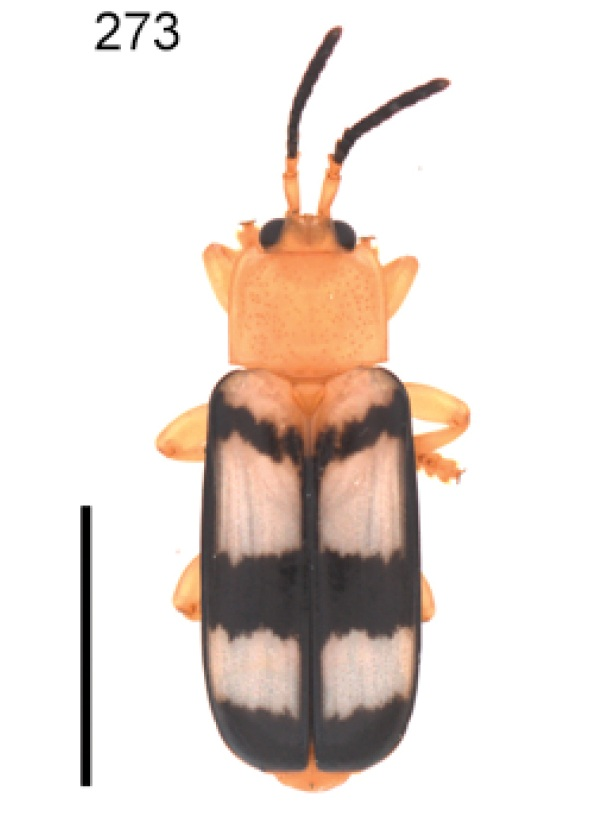

Scientific classification
- Kingdom: Animalia
- Phylum: Arthropoda
- Class: Insecta
- Order: Coleoptera
- Suborder: Polyphaga
- Infraorder: Cucujiformia
- Family: Chrysomelidae
- Genus: Cephaloleia
- Species: C. stainesi

Binomial name
- Cephaloleia stainesi García-Robledo, 2014

= Cephaloleia stainesi =

Species of beetle

Cephaloleia stainesi is a species of beetle of the family Chrysomelidae. It is found in Costa Rica.

== Description ==
Adults reach a length of about 6.7 mm. The head, pronotum, scutellum, venter and legs are yellowish. Antennomeres 1, 2, and the apical half of 11 are yellow, while 3 to 10 and the basal half of 11 are black. The elytron is black with six large, oval, pale yellowish-white maculae.

== Biology ==
The recorded host plant is Heliconia latispatha.
