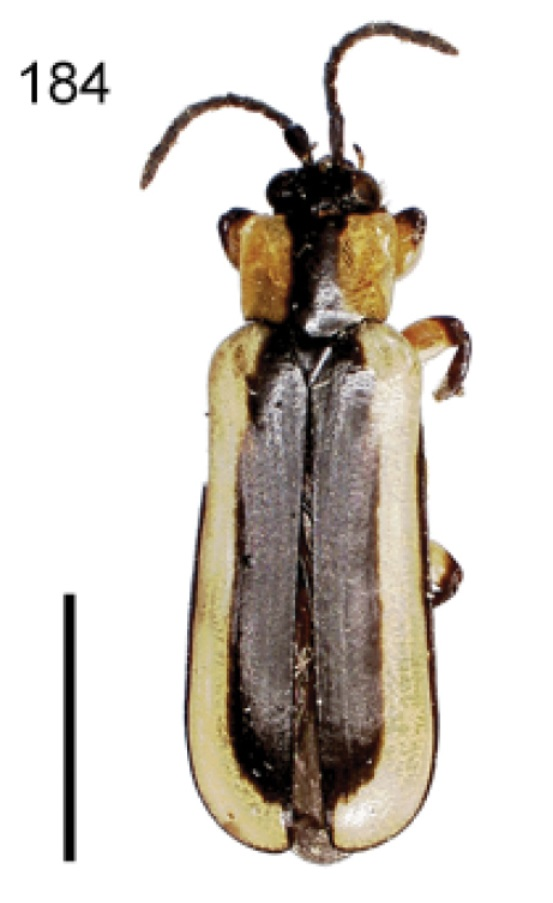

Scientific classification
- Kingdom: Animalia
- Phylum: Arthropoda
- Class: Insecta
- Order: Coleoptera
- Suborder: Polyphaga
- Infraorder: Cucujiformia
- Family: Chrysomelidae
- Genus: Cephaloleia
- Species: C. marginella

Binomial name
- Cephaloleia marginella Uhmann, 1930

= Cephaloleia marginella =

Species of beetle

Cephaloleia marginella is a species of beetle of the family Chrysomelidae. It is found in Costa Rica and Panama.

== Description ==
Adults reach a length of about 6.4–8 mm. The head is black and the pronotum is yellow except for a black longitudinal medial vitta from the base to the apex. The elytron is yellow with two black vittae.

== Biology ==
The recorded food plants are Heliconia species. Adults have been collected on Caesalpinia eriostachys.
