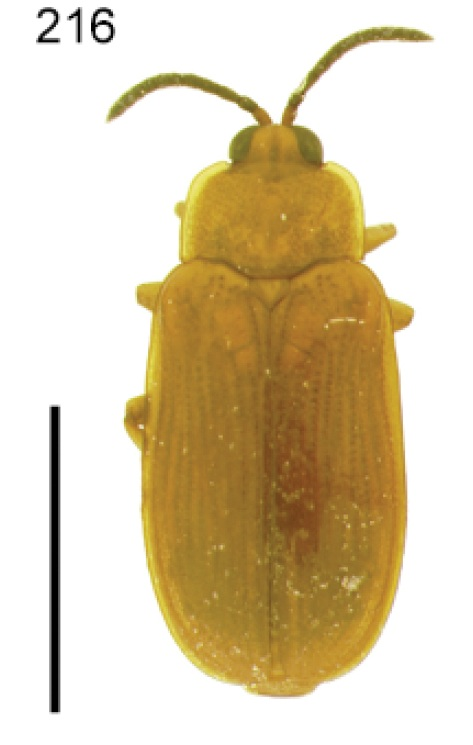

Scientific classification
- Kingdom: Animalia
- Phylum: Arthropoda
- Class: Insecta
- Order: Coleoptera
- Suborder: Polyphaga
- Infraorder: Cucujiformia
- Family: Chrysomelidae
- Genus: Cephaloleia
- Species: C. proxima

Binomial name
- Cephaloleia proxima Baly, 1858

= Cephaloleia proxima =

Species of beetle

Cephaloleia proxima is a species of beetle of the family Chrysomelidae. It is found in Brazil (Amazonas, Pará), French Guiana and Peru.

== Description ==
Adults reach a length of about 5.6–6.8 mm. Adults are reddish-yellow, with the eyes and antennae (except antennomere 1) black.

== Biology ==
Adults have been collected feeding on Heliconia species.
