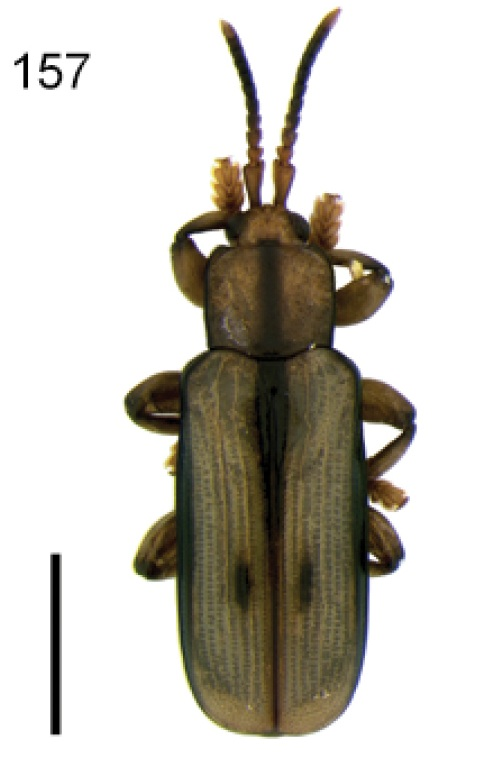

Scientific classification
- Kingdom: Animalia
- Phylum: Arthropoda
- Class: Insecta
- Order: Coleoptera
- Suborder: Polyphaga
- Infraorder: Cucujiformia
- Family: Chrysomelidae
- Genus: Cephaloleia
- Species: C. heliconiae

Binomial name
- Cephaloleia heliconiae Uhmann, 1930

= Cephaloleia heliconiae =

Species of beetle

Cephaloleia heliconiae is a species of beetle in the family Chrysomelidae. It is found in Costa Rica and Panama.

== Description ==
Adults reach a length of about 8.1–9 mm. Adults are yellowish-brown, while the eyes are dark and antennomeres 1, 2, 11 are yellowish and 3–10 are dark. The elytron has black sutural and lateral vittae and two black maculae after the middle and the pronotum sometimes has a black longitudinal medial vitta.

== Biology ==
Adults have been collected in young rolled leaves of Heliconia species, Calathea insignis, Cephaloleia crotalifera and Cephaloleia lutea.
