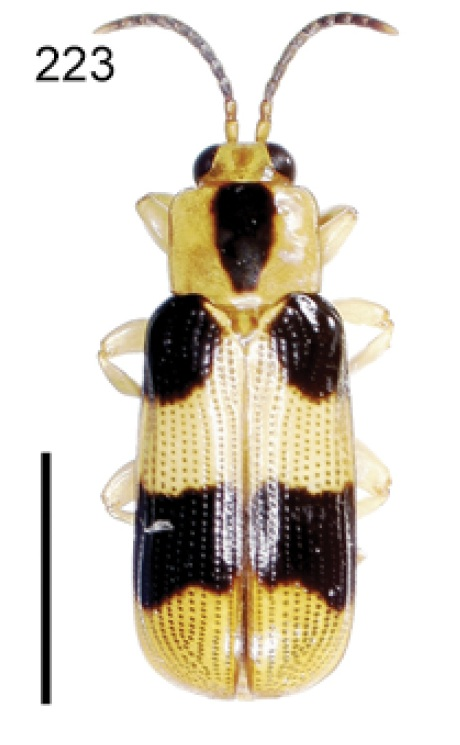

Scientific classification
- Kingdom: Animalia
- Phylum: Arthropoda
- Class: Insecta
- Order: Coleoptera
- Suborder: Polyphaga
- Infraorder: Cucujiformia
- Family: Chrysomelidae
- Genus: Cephaloleia
- Species: C. reventazonica

Binomial name
- Cephaloleia reventazonica Uhmann, 1930

= Cephaloleia reventazonica =

Species of beetle

Cephaloleia reventazonica is a species of beetle of the family Chrysomelidae. It is found in Costa Rica and Nicaragua.

== Description ==
Adults reach a length of about 6.1–7.1 mm. Adults are pale yellow, with the antennae black (except for antennomeres 1 and 11). The pronotum has a black subtriangular macula and black anterior and basal margins. The elytron has a black lateral margin and the humeral macula is subquadrate. The venter and legs are pale yellow.

== Biology ==
Adults have been collected feeding on Heliconia lathispatha, Heliconia pogonantha, Calathea lutea, Cephaloleia marantifolia and Heliconia psittacorum.
