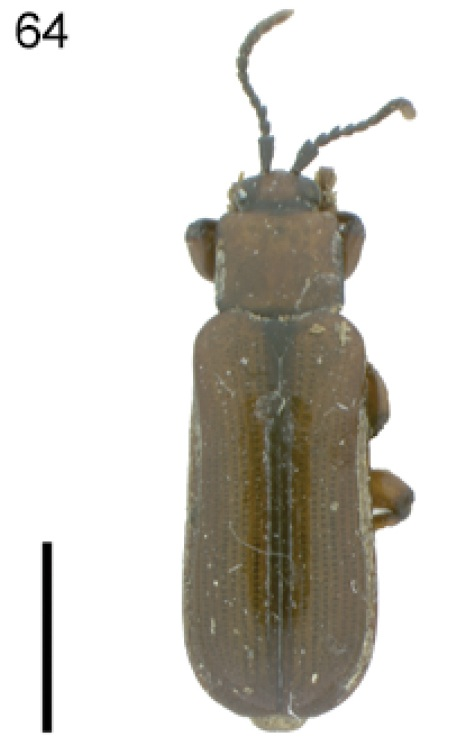

Scientific classification
- Kingdom: Animalia
- Phylum: Arthropoda
- Class: Insecta
- Order: Coleoptera
- Suborder: Polyphaga
- Infraorder: Cucujiformia
- Family: Chrysomelidae
- Genus: Cephaloleia
- Species: C. adusta

Binomial name
- Cephaloleia adusta Uhmann, 1930

= Cephaloleia adusta =

Species of beetle

Cephaloleia adusta is a species of beetle of the family Chrysomelidae. It is found in Costa Rica.

== Description ==
Adults reach a length of about 8.6–10.5 mm. Adults are yellowish-brown with black antennae (except the apical three antennomeres which are brownish). The head is black near the eyes and the pronotum has fine narrow black margins. The scutellum and elytral suture is black and the elytral lateral margin is dark reddish-brown.

== Biology ==
The hostplant is unknown, but adults have been collected on Heliconia species.
