= Platanillo =

Platanillo is a common name for several plants and may refer to:

- Canna indica
- Heliconia collinsiana

== See also ==
- Plantanillo Gorge salamander
