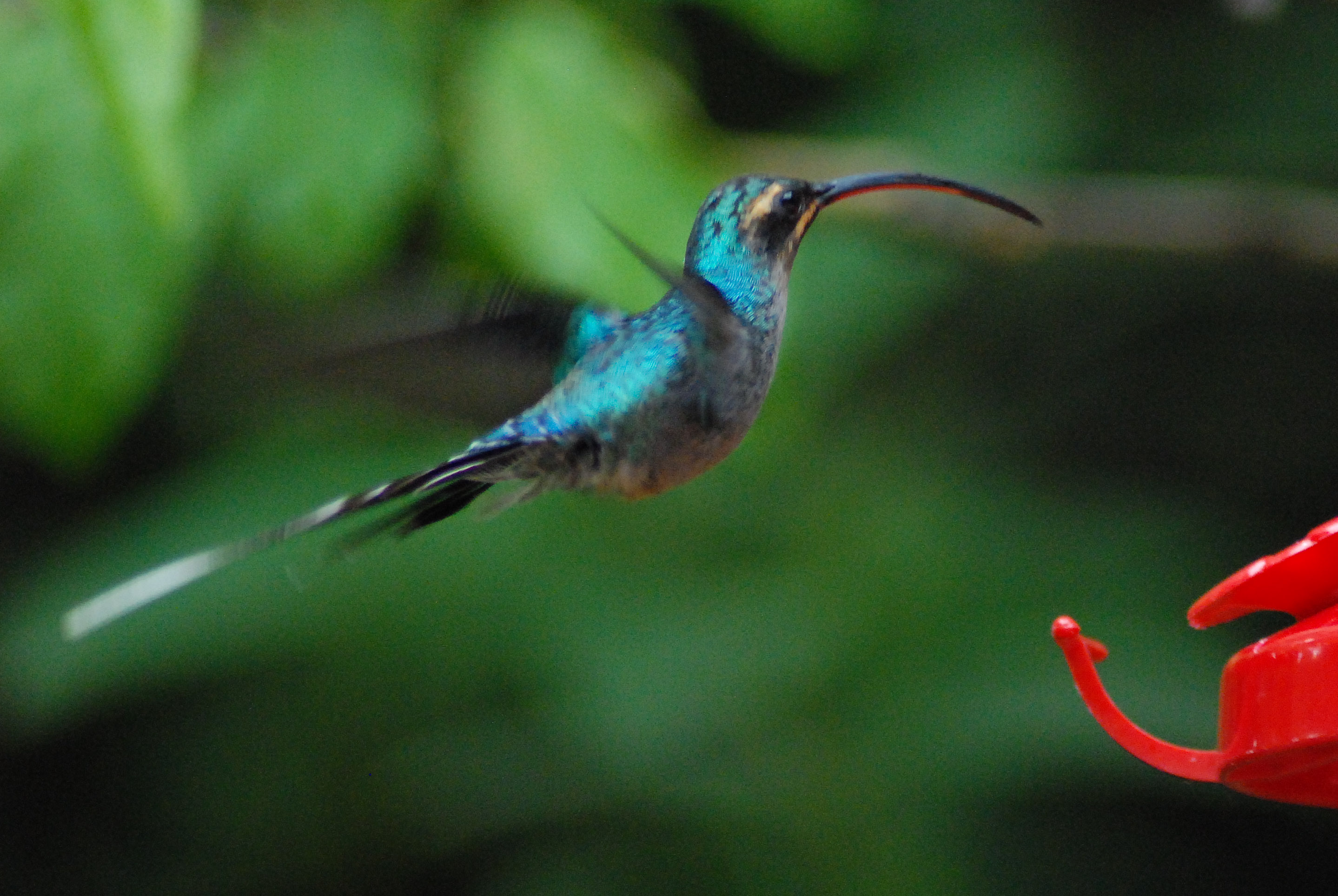

Conservation status
- Least Concern (IUCN 3.1)
- CITES Appendix II (CITES)

Scientific classification
- Kingdom: Animalia
- Phylum: Chordata
- Class: Aves
- Clade: Strisores
- Order: Apodiformes
- Family: Trochilidae
- Genus: Phaethornis
- Species: P. guy

Binomial name
- Phaethornis guy (Lesson, 1833)

= Green hermit =

Species of bird

The green hermit (Phaethornis guy) is a large hummingbird that is a resident breeder from southern Central America (Costa Rica and Panama) south to northern South America (north-eastern Venezuela and Trinidad, and the northern Andes of eastern Peru)

== Description ==
It is 13.5 cm (5.3 in) long and weighs 6.3 g (0.22 oz). The male is mainly dark green with a blue-green rump. It has a dark mask through the eye, with buff stripes above and below this, and down the centre of the throat. The central feathers of the tapered tail are—for large hermit—relatively short and white-tipped, and are wiggled in display at the communal leks. The reddish bill is long and decurved. The female is sooty gray (rather than green) below, with an even longer bill and a much longer tail. The call of this species is a loud zurk, and the males' lekking "song" is a repeated swark.

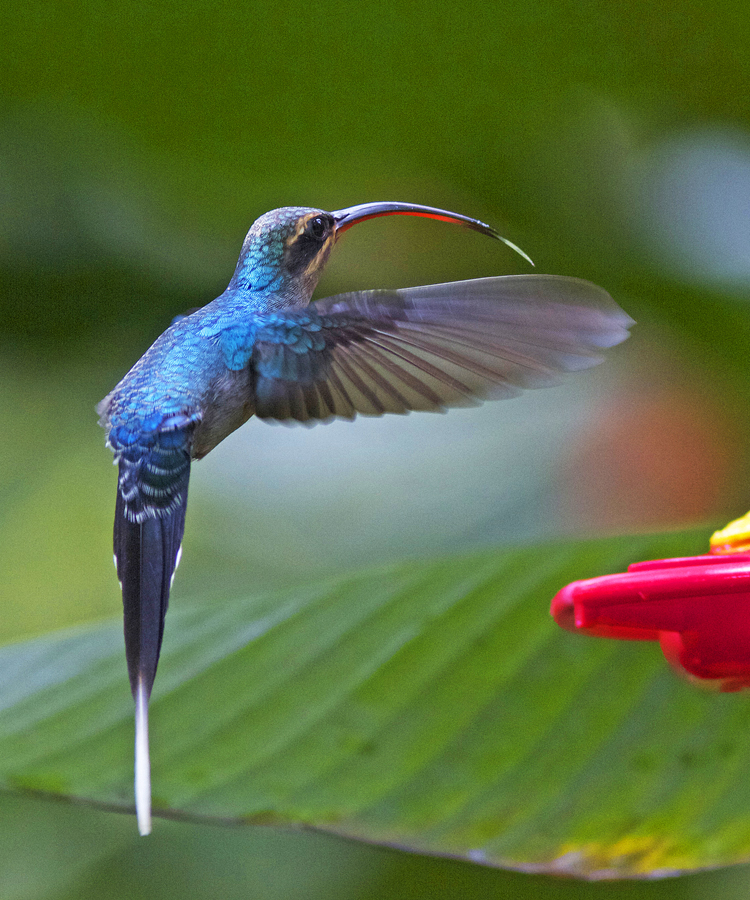
Green hermit with its white tongue out

== Distribution and habitat ==
The nominate subspecies Phaethornis guy guy is found in Venezuela and Trinidad. The western P. g. apicalis of the American Cordillera is slightly smaller and the sexes more similar.

This hermit inhabits forest undergrowth, usually near water, and prefers hilly areas. It seems to favor primary rainforest and wet premontane forest, and though it tolerates some amount of habitat destruction (e.g. subsistence farmland) it will try to avoid secondary forest as long as better habitat is available. In the Colombian Cordillera Oriental, it has been recorded at altitudes from 650–1,750 m (2,130–5,740 ft) ASL. Habitat there usually has a canopy height of around 25 m (82 ft) and is dominated by trees such as Elaeagia (Rubiaceae) or palms; there is usually plentiful undergrowth and/or epiphytes and hemiepiphytes (e.g. Clusiaceae).

== Behaviour ==
Santa Elena Reserve, Monteverde, Costa Rica

=== Feeding ===
The food of this species is nectar, taken from a wide variety of flowers, and some small insects; it prefers flowers 30–50 mm long by 2–7 mm wide, though it will occasionally visit flowers up to 75 mm long and 20 mm wide or as short as 15 mm. At Monteverde (Costa Rica), preferred foodplants include yellow jacobinia (Justicia umbrosa) and Razisea spicata (Acanthaceae), Pitcairnia brittoniana (Bromeliaceae), spiral ginger (Costus barbatus, Costaceae), Drymonia conchocalyx and D. rubra (Gesneriaceae), Heliconia tortuosa (Heliconiaceae), and Malvaviscus palmanus (Malvaceae). Less commonly visited flowers were mostly Gesneriaceae, Heliconiaceae (such as Heliconia bihai), Acanthaceae (such as Pachystachys coccinea) and Zingiberales, but also certain Bromeliaceae (such as Tillandsia fasciculata) Campanulaceae (such as Centropogon surinamensis), Ericaceae and Rubiaceae.

=== Breeding ===
As noted above, males assemble at leks for courtship. In the Colombian Cordillera Oriental, active leks were observed between September and November, but neither in August nor in December, indicating a distinct breeding season. The green hermit lays one egg in a conical nest suspended under a large leaf, usually over water. Incubation is 17–18 days, and fledging another 21 to 23 days.
