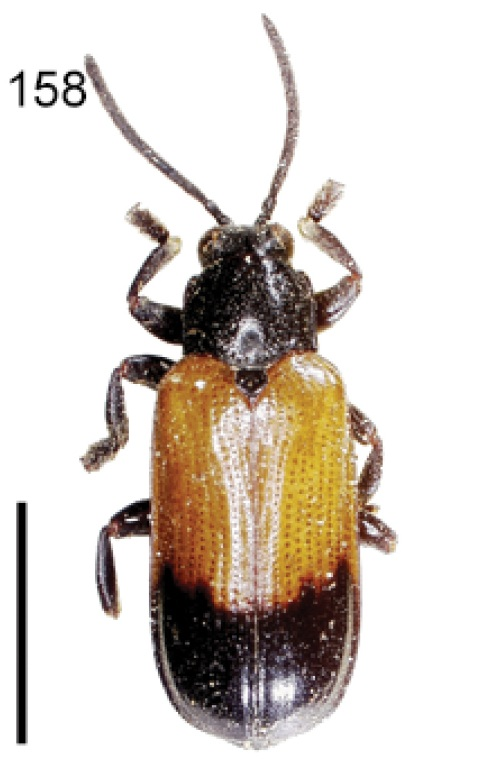

Scientific classification
- Kingdom: Animalia
- Phylum: Arthropoda
- Clade: Pancrustacea
- Class: Insecta
- Order: Coleoptera
- Suborder: Polyphaga
- Infraorder: Cucujiformia
- Family: Chrysomelidae
- Genus: Cephaloleia
- Species: C. histrio

Binomial name
- Cephaloleia histrio Guérin-Méneville, 1844

= Cephaloleia histrio =

Species of beetle

Cephaloleia histrio is a species of beetle in the family Chrysomelidae. It is found in Bolivia, Colombia, Ecuador, Peru and Venezuela.

== Description ==
Adults reach a length of about 5.6–6.8 mm. Adults are shining black, with the basal two-thirds of the elytron yellowish and the remainder black. The scutellum and legs are also black.

== Biology ==
Adults have been collected feeding on Heliconia species.
