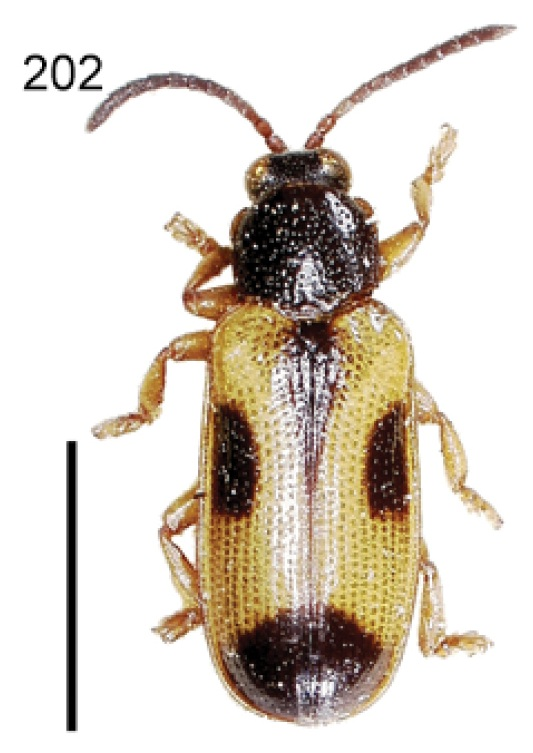

Scientific classification
- Kingdom: Animalia
- Phylum: Arthropoda
- Class: Insecta
- Order: Coleoptera
- Suborder: Polyphaga
- Infraorder: Cucujiformia
- Family: Chrysomelidae
- Genus: Cephaloleia
- Species: C. ornata

Binomial name
- Cephaloleia ornata Waterhouse, 1881

= Cephaloleia ornata =

Species of beetle

Cephaloleia ornata is a species of beetle of the family Chrysomelidae. It is found in Bolivia, Brazil (São Paulo), Colombia, Ecuador, Peru and Venezuela.

== Description ==
Adults reach a length of about 5.4–5.8 mm. The elytron is yellow with a dark vitta at the base and the apical one-fifth black, as well as a small elongate black macula on the side near the middle. The legs are yellowish.

== Biology ==
Adults have been collected feeding on Calathea lanata and Heliconia species.
