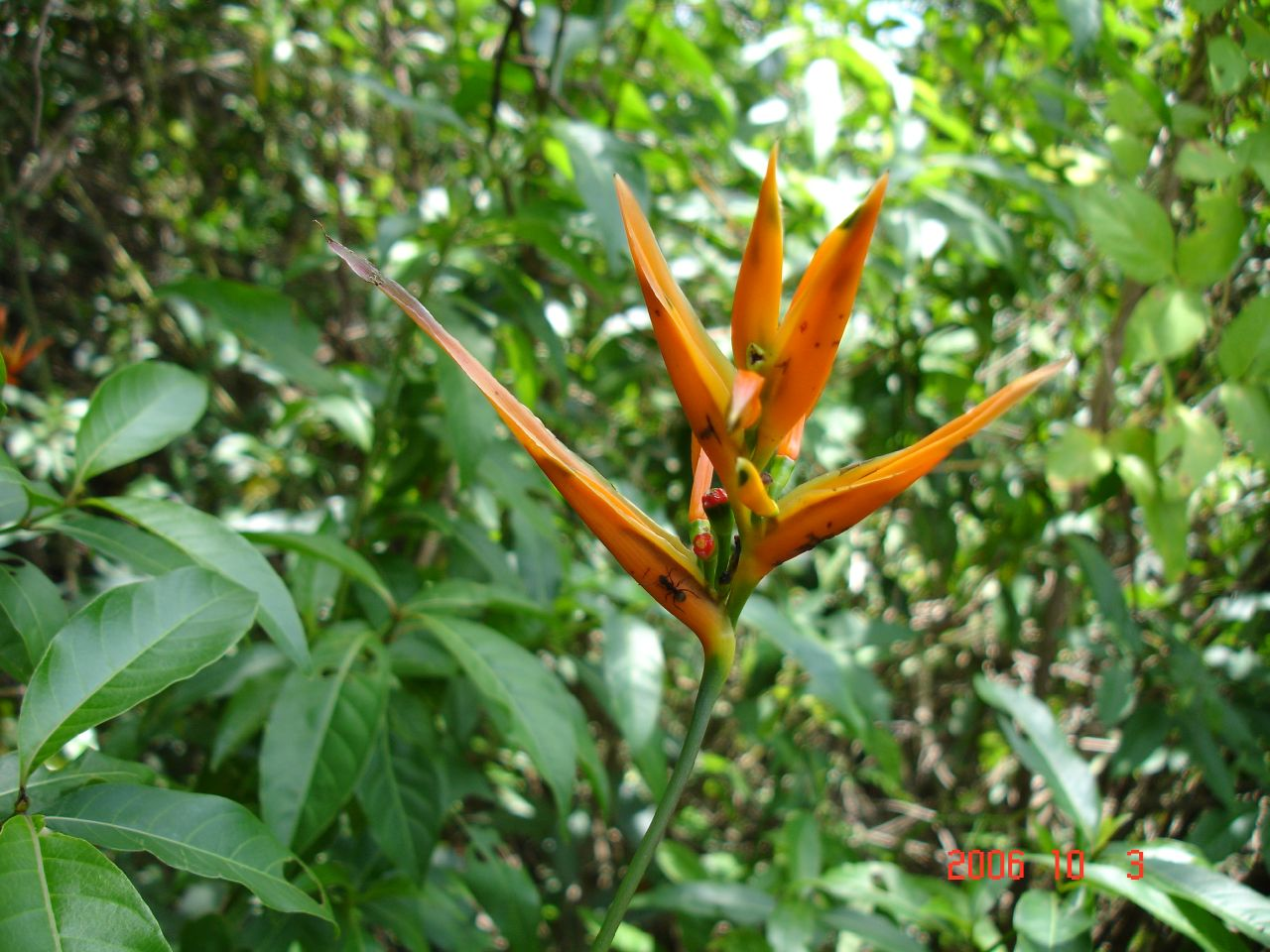

Scientific classification
- Kingdom: Plantae
- Clade: Tracheophytes
- Clade: Angiosperms
- Clade: Monocots
- Clade: Commelinids
- Order: Zingiberales
- Family: Heliconiaceae
- Genus: Heliconia
- Species: H. hirsuta

Binomial name
- Heliconia hirsuta L.f.

Synonyms
- Bihai harrisiana Griggs; Bihai hirsuta (L.f.) Kuntze; Heliconia costanensis Aristeg.

= Heliconia hirsuta =

Species of flowering plant

Heliconia hirsuta is a species of flowering plant in the family Heliconiaceae. This plant is an erect herb up to 2 m tall, and it is native to Central America, South America, and the Caribbean, from Belize to Trinidad to Argentina.

== Uses ==
Heliconia hirsuta is widely cultivated as an ornamental plant in hot regions with humid climates.
