= Heliconia brenneri =

Conservation status
- Vulnerable (IUCN 3.1)

Scientific classification
- Kingdom: Plantae
- Clade: Tracheophytes
- Clade: Angiosperms
- Clade: Monocots
- Clade: Commelinids
- Order: Zingiberales
- Family: Heliconiaceae
- Genus: Heliconia
- Species: H. brenneri

Binomial name
- Heliconia brenneri Abalo & G.L.Morales

Species of flowering plant

Heliconia brenneri is a plant species in the family Heliconiaceae. It is endemic to Ecuador. Its natural habitat is subtropical or tropical moist montane forest. The expansion of the road passing through its range poses a potential threat.
