= Heliconia willisiana =

Conservation status
- Data Deficient (IUCN 3.1)

Scientific classification
- Kingdom: Plantae
- Clade: Tracheophytes
- Clade: Angiosperms
- Clade: Monocots
- Clade: Commelinids
- Order: Zingiberales
- Family: Heliconiaceae
- Genus: Heliconia
- Species: H. willisiana

Binomial name
- Heliconia willisiana Abalo & G.L.Morales

Species of flowering plant

Heliconia willisiana is a species of plant in the family Heliconiaceae It is endemic to Ecuador.
