= Heliconia excelsa =

Conservation status
- Vulnerable (IUCN 3.1)

Scientific classification
- Kingdom: Plantae
- Clade: Tracheophytes
- Clade: Angiosperms
- Clade: Monocots
- Clade: Commelinids
- Order: Zingiberales
- Family: Heliconiaceae
- Genus: Heliconia
- Species: H. excelsa

Binomial name
- Heliconia excelsa L.Andersson

Species of flowering plant

Heliconia excelsa is a species of plant in the family Heliconiaceae. It is endemic to Ecuador. Its natural habitat is subtropical or tropical moist lowland forest.

== Description ==
At its maturity, it can reach a height of 8' to 12' or 15' (2.4 meters to 3.6 or 4.5 meters) in full sun to half shade.

The giant heliconia is a large and impressive plant that can reach heights of up to 6 meters (20 feet). It has long, arching leaves with prominent midribs and beautiful inflorescences that resemble the claws of a lobster. The bracts, which are modified leaves surrounding the flowers, are typically bright red or orange and may have yellow or green accents. The flowers are small and inconspicuous, usually hidden within the colorful bracts. They are pollinated by hummingbirds and certain insects that are attracted to the vibrant colors and nectar-rich structures. The plant relies on these pollinators for reproduction. In its natural habitat, the giant heliconia grows in the understory of tropical rainforests. It prefers moist, well-draining soils and thrives in warm and humid climates. It is often cultivated as an ornamental plant in tropical and subtropical regions worldwide due to its striking appearance.
