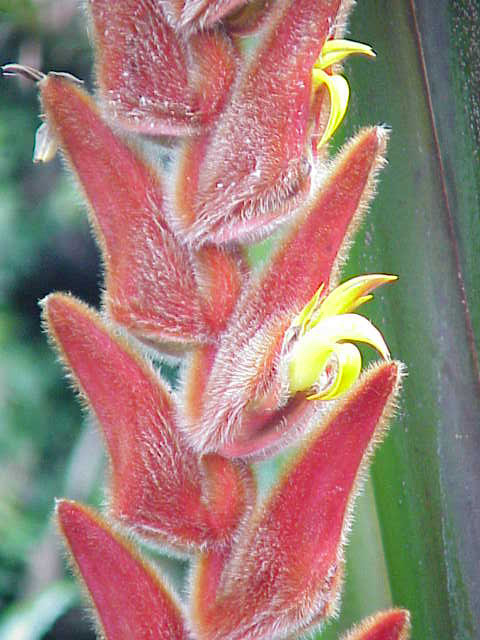

Scientific classification
- Kingdom: Plantae
- Clade: Tracheophytes
- Clade: Angiosperms
- Clade: Monocots
- Clade: Commelinids
- Order: Zingiberales
- Family: Heliconiaceae
- Genus: Heliconia
- Species: H. vellerigera

Binomial name
- Heliconia vellerigera Poepp.

Synonyms
- Bihai vellerigera (Poepp.) Kuntze

= Heliconia vellerigera =

Species of plant

Heliconia vellerigera is a plant species in the family Heliconiaceae, native to Colombia, Ecuador, Peru and Costa Rica. It is a large herb up to 6 m (20 feet) tall with a pendulous inflorescence of 20-30 red-orange bracts covered with cinnamon-colored hairs.
