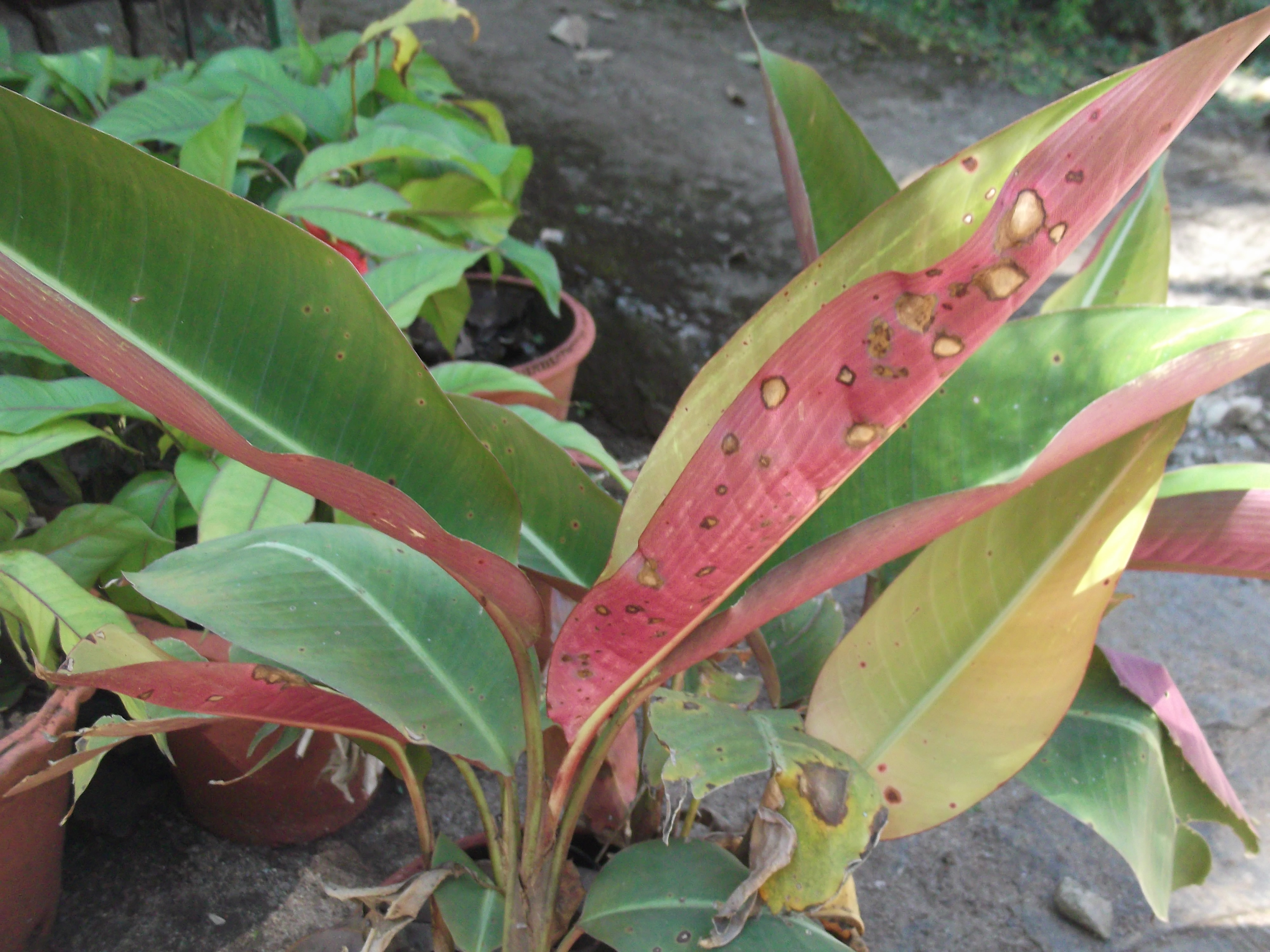

Scientific classification
- Kingdom: Plantae
- Clade: Tracheophytes
- Clade: Angiosperms
- Clade: Monocots
- Clade: Commelinids
- Order: Zingiberales
- Family: Heliconiaceae
- Genus: Heliconia
- Species: H. indica

Binomial name
- Heliconia indica Lam.

= Heliconia indica =

Species of flowering plant

Heliconia indica is a species of plant in the family Heliconiaceae. It is found in Maluku and the southwest Pacific.

== Names ==
Heliconia indica is reconstructed as *rako in the Proto-Eastern Oceanic language, the reconstructed ancestor of the Eastern Oceanic languages.
