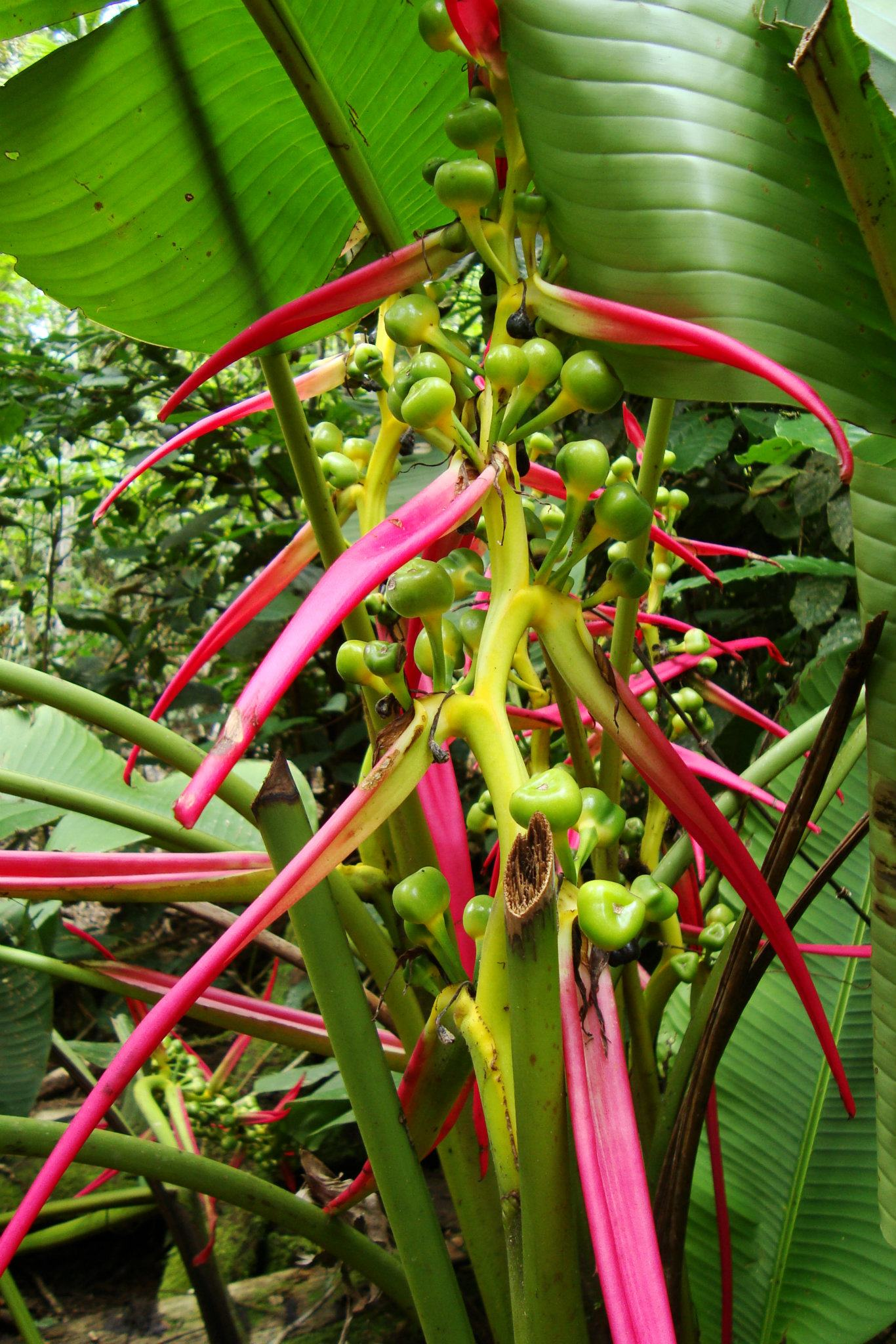

Scientific classification
- Kingdom: Plantae
- Clade: Tracheophytes
- Clade: Angiosperms
- Clade: Monocots
- Clade: Commelinids
- Order: Zingiberales
- Family: Heliconiaceae
- Genus: Heliconia
- Species: H. aemygdiana

Binomial name
- Heliconia aemygdiana Burle Marx

= Heliconia aemygdiana =

Species of plant

Heliconia aemygdiana is a species of flowering plant in the family Heliconiaceae. It is a rhizomatous geophyte found in tropical South America. It has a cucumber-like aroma.

The plant has been described by the famous Brazilian landscapist and architect Roberto Burle Marx.
