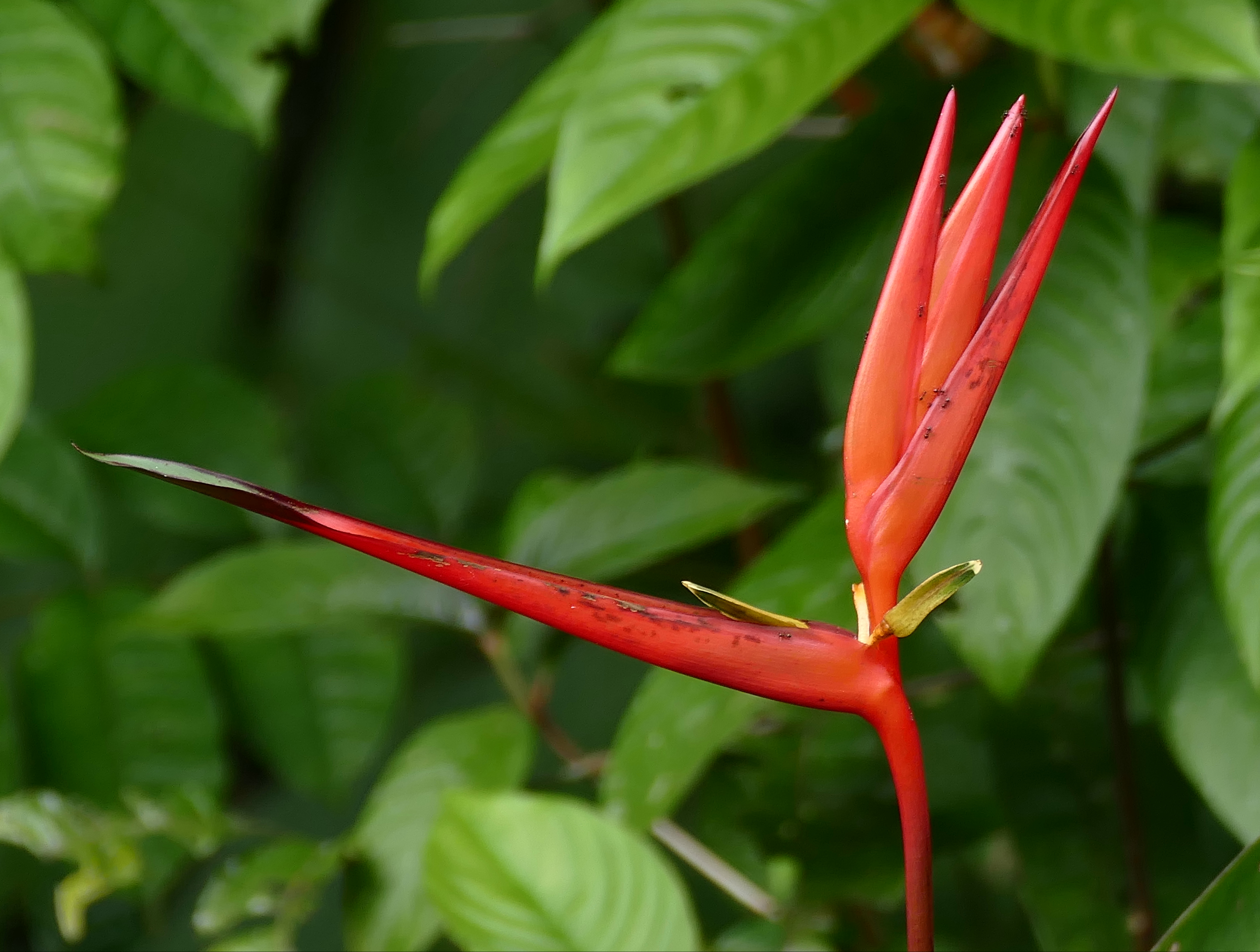

Scientific classification
- Kingdom: Plantae
- Clade: Tracheophytes
- Clade: Angiosperms
- Clade: Monocots
- Clade: Commelinids
- Order: Zingiberales
- Family: Heliconiaceae
- Genus: Heliconia
- Species: H. acuminata

Binomial name
- Heliconia acuminata Rich.

Synonyms
- Bihai acuminata (A.Rich.) Kuntze

= Heliconia acuminata =

Species of plant

Heliconia acuminata (syn.: Heliconia pearcei Rusby) is a species of plant in the family Heliconiaceae. It is an erect herb, typically growing 1.6 m tall, native to the South American countries of Brazil, French Guiana, Guyana, Suriname, Venezuela, Colombia, Bolivia and Peru. It is also grown as an ornamental plant in other regions.
