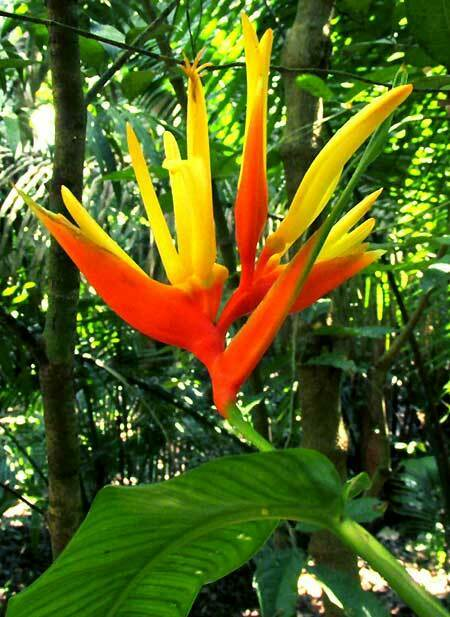
- Heliconia aurantiaca flowers

Scientific classification
- Kingdom: Plantae
- Clade: Tracheophytes
- Clade: Angiosperms
- Clade: Monocots
- Clade: Commelinids
- Order: Zingiberales
- Family: Heliconiaceae
- Genus: Heliconia
- Species: H. aurantiaca

Binomial name
- Heliconia aurantiaca Verschaff.(1861)

Synonyms
- Bihai aurantiaca (Verschaff.) Griggs (1904); Bihai choconiana (S.Watson) Griggs (1904); Heliconia brevispatha Hook. (1863); Heliconia choconiana S. Watson (1888)

= Heliconia aurantiaca =

Species of flowering plant

Heliconia aurantiaca, sometimes known as the Golden Dwarf Heliconia or Yellow Heliconia, is a species of flowering plant belonging to the monotypic Heliconia family, the Heliconiaceae.

== Description ==
Heliconia aurantiaca grows up to 1.5m tall (~5ft). It's herbaceous and arises from rhizomes. Its leaves are large and glossy, similar to those on banana and ginger plants. Blades up to 35cm long and 7cm wide (~14 x 3 inches) are lobed or "eared" at their bases, and have no petioles, or very short ones.

Inflorescences are held erect atop peduncles. Rachises and scoop-shaped bracts subtending individual flowers are red to orange. The flowers' remarkable structure results from having evolved to accommodate both hummingbird pollinators and insect herbivores; they develop upside-down and at right angles to their bracts. Perianths are curved, green to yellow, and with green to yellow ovaries. Mature fruits are blue and hairless. Fruits are drupes.

== Distribution ==
Heliconia aurantiaca naturally occurs from southern Mexico south into Costa Rica.

== Habitat ==
In Nicaragua Heliconia aurantiaca is described as relatively common in very humid forest understories on the Atlantic side, at an elevation of 150 to 1200m (~500-4000ft).

A collection from Belize was made in a forest's shaded understory in a seasonally dry rainforest on limestone.

== As ornamental plants ==
Heliconia aurantiaca is cold-sensitive, needing temperatures above ~4.5°C (~40°F). They don't tolerate heavy clearing and disturbance. Gardeners in warm areas do grow the species, however, because its inflorescences are excellent for cut flower arrangements, plus it serves well along borders where it spreads quickly and makes an attractive mass effect. Its leaves wilt when used as cut foliage.

== Taxonomy ==
A 2025 study of the genus Heliconia, based on extensive fieldwork and genetic analysis, concludes that the genus consists of 17 sections in five subgenera. Heliconia aurantiaca belongs to the newly erected section Aurantiacae.

Heliconia aurantiaca was first described by Ambroise Verschaffelt (1825-1886), a horticulturist in Belgium. The description appeared in his nursery catalogue. Here is the original 1861 description in French, translated into English, Spanish and German:

== Etymology ==
The genus name Heliconia is named after Mount Helicon in southern Greece, regarded as the home of the Muses.

The species name aurantiaca is from the New Latin aurantiacus meaning "orange, between yellow and scarlet," apparently in reference to the flower color.

== Gallery ==
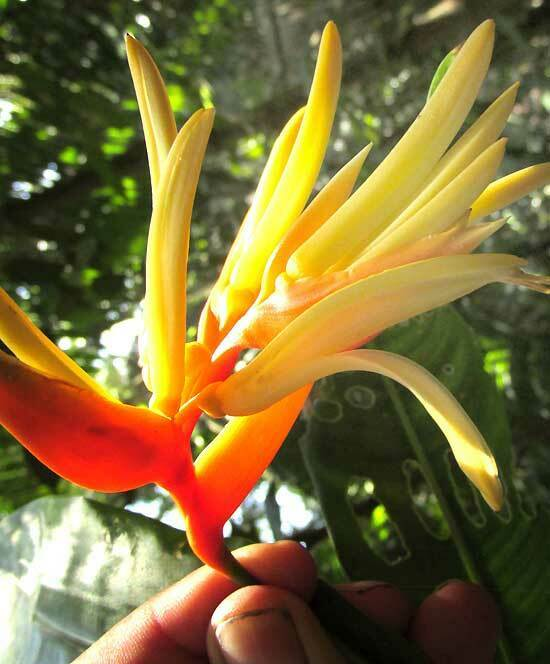
Heliconia aurantiaca yellow flowers above red bracts

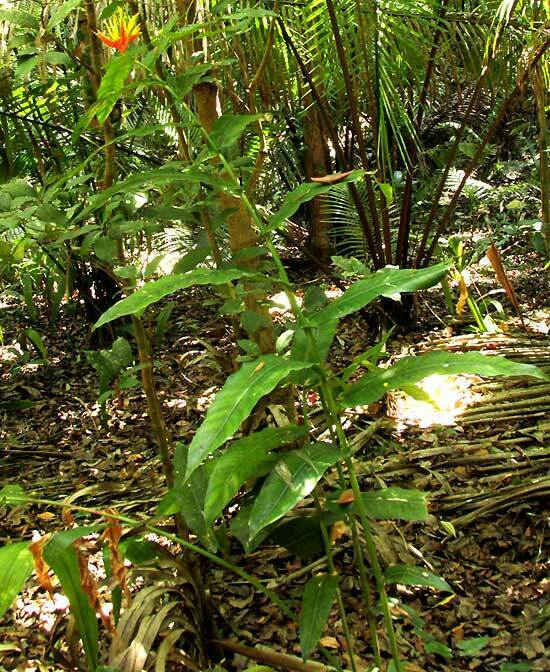
Heliconia aurantiaca plant in Guatemalan habitat

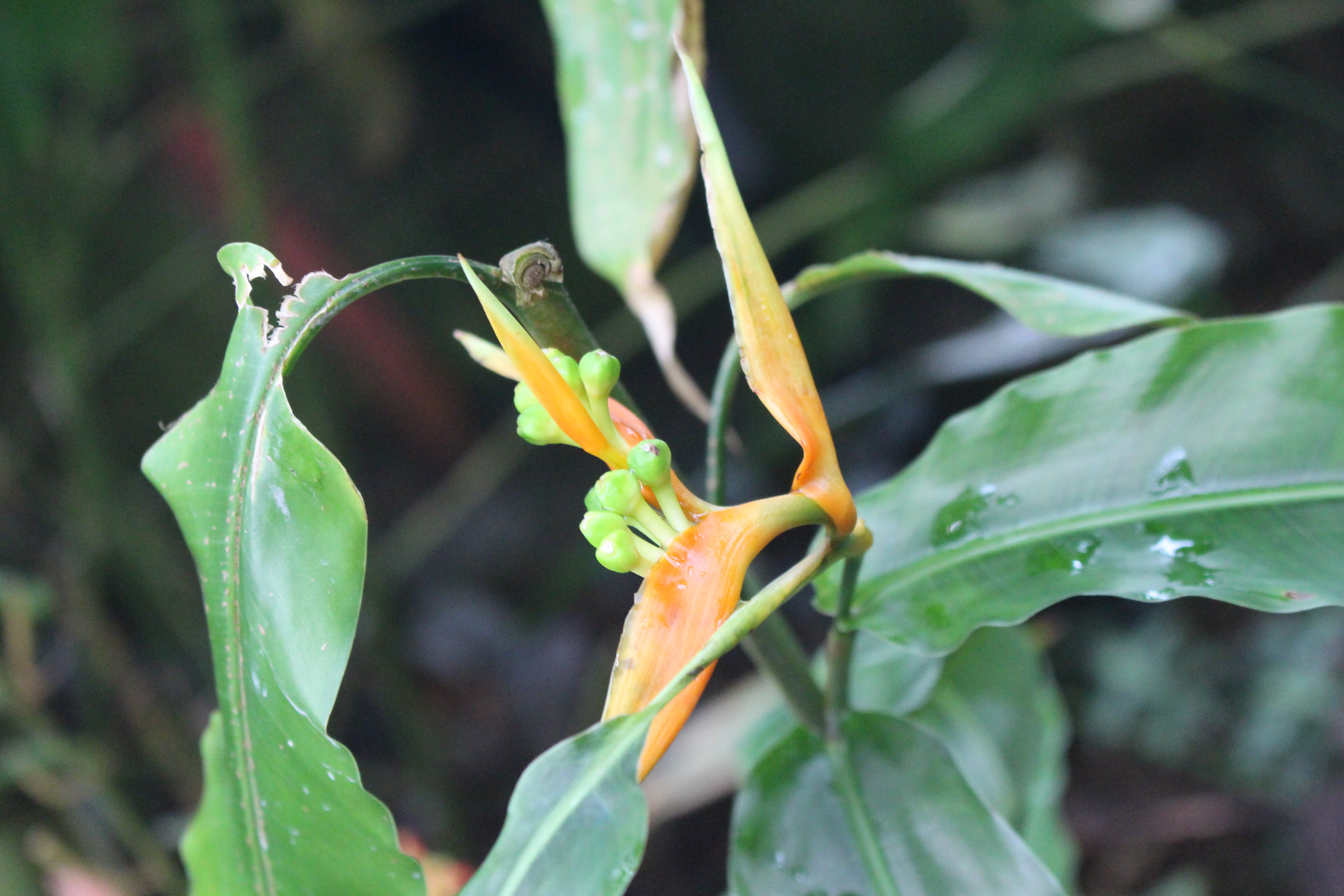
Heliconia aurantiaca bracts with green fruits
