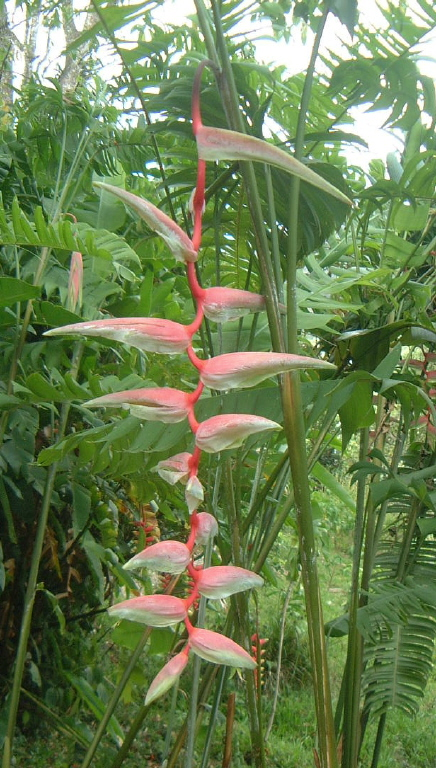
- Specimen at Asa Wright Nature Centre, Arima, Trinidad and Tobago

Scientific classification
- Kingdom: Plantae
- Clade: Tracheophytes
- Clade: Angiosperms
- Clade: Monocots
- Clade: Commelinids
- Order: Zingiberales
- Family: Heliconiaceae
- Genus: Heliconia
- Species: H. chartacea

Binomial name
- Heliconia chartacea Lane ex Barreiros

= Heliconia chartacea =

Species of plant

Heliconia chartacea is a species of Heliconia native to tropical South America (Brazil, Venezuela, French Guiana, Suriname, Guyana, colombia, Ecuador and Peru).

== Description ==
Heliconia chartacea is a herbaceous plant, with paired large oblong leaves like those of the banana. It can grow to 7–8 m in height, and plants can form large clumps with age. The flowering stems are pendulous. The bright pink color of the flower bracts is rare among heliconias, making it very easy to identify. The conspicuous pink part of the large and showy hanging inflorescences is actually the waxy bracts, (modified leaves), with the small green true flowers half-hidden inside. It has blue-black fruits that contain 3 very hard seeds, which are capable of extended dormancy in the soil. The fruits are eaten by a variety of birds, including tanagers and thrushes.

== Ecology ==
Heliconia chartacea is a common upland species of disturbed sites, young secondary forest, and abandoned cultivation, and is often found near human habitation. It is pollinated by hermit hummingbirds, whose curved beaks are well adapted to probe the curved flowers for nectar, their main food source. Some species such as the rufous-breasted hermit also use the plant for nesting.

== Uses ==
Several cultivars have been selected for garden planting, including 'Sexy Pink' and 'Sexy Scarlet'. These flowers are widely used for Flower Decorations and Ikebana.
