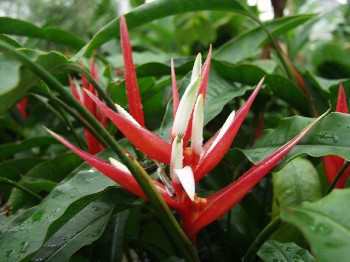

Scientific classification
- Kingdom: Plantae
- Clade: Tracheophytes
- Clade: Angiosperms
- Clade: Monocots
- Clade: Commelinids
- Order: Zingiberales
- Family: Heliconiaceae
- Genus: Heliconia
- Species: H. angusta

Binomial name
- Heliconia angusta Vell.

= Heliconia angusta =

Species of flowering plant

Heliconia angusta Vell. (syn.: Heliconia agustifolia Hook., Heliconia bicolor Benth., Heliconia brasiliensis Hook.), of family Heliconiaceae is an erect herb typically growing 0.70 m tall, native to Brazil (South America).

== General ==
Heliconia angusta is commonly called the Christmas heliconia because its red and white inflorescences usually emerge during the Christmas period. Wild populations, native to southeastern Brazil, are classified as vulnerable by the World Conservation Union largely due to the conversion of their diminishing habitats for agricultural purposes. However, the genetic diversity of wild populations has, at least in part, been preserved by the ex-situ cultivation of Heliconia angusta. The popularity of Heliconia angusta as a tropical garden plant and horticultural specimen has encouraged widespread propagation of this species by commercial nurseries and botanical gardens.

== Uses ==
It is a popular ornamental plant in subtropical regions with a humid climate. The most cold hardy of Heliconia, it is grown with success in warm temperate climates.
