= Heliconia obscura =

Conservation status
- Vulnerable (IUCN 3.1)

Scientific classification
- Kingdom: Plantae
- Clade: Tracheophytes
- Clade: Angiosperms
- Clade: Monocots
- Clade: Commelinids
- Order: Zingiberales
- Family: Heliconiaceae
- Genus: Heliconia
- Species: H. obscura

Binomial name
- Heliconia obscura Dodson & A.H.Gentry

Species of plant

Heliconia obscura is a species of plant in the family Heliconiaceae. It is native to Ecuador and Peru. Its natural habitats are subtropical or tropical moist lowland forests and subtropical or tropical moist montane forests.
