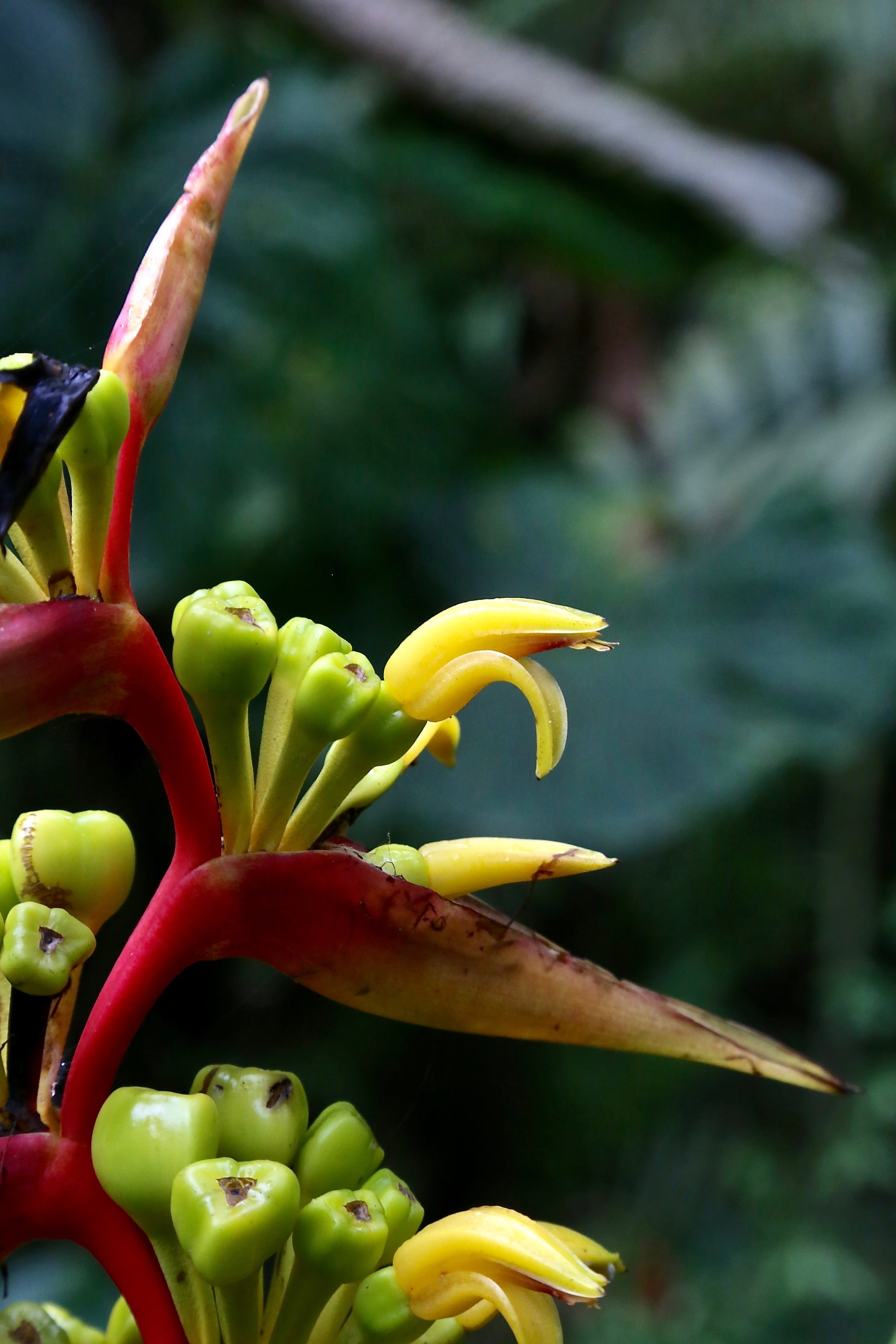

Scientific classification
- Kingdom: Plantae
- Clade: Tracheophytes
- Clade: Angiosperms
- Clade: Monocots
- Clade: Commelinids
- Order: Zingiberales
- Family: Heliconiaceae
- Genus: Heliconia
- Species: H. impudica

Binomial name
- Heliconia impudica Abalo & G.L.Morales

= Heliconia impudica =

Species of flowering plant

Heliconia impudica is a species of plant in the family Heliconiaceae. It is endemic to Ecuador.
