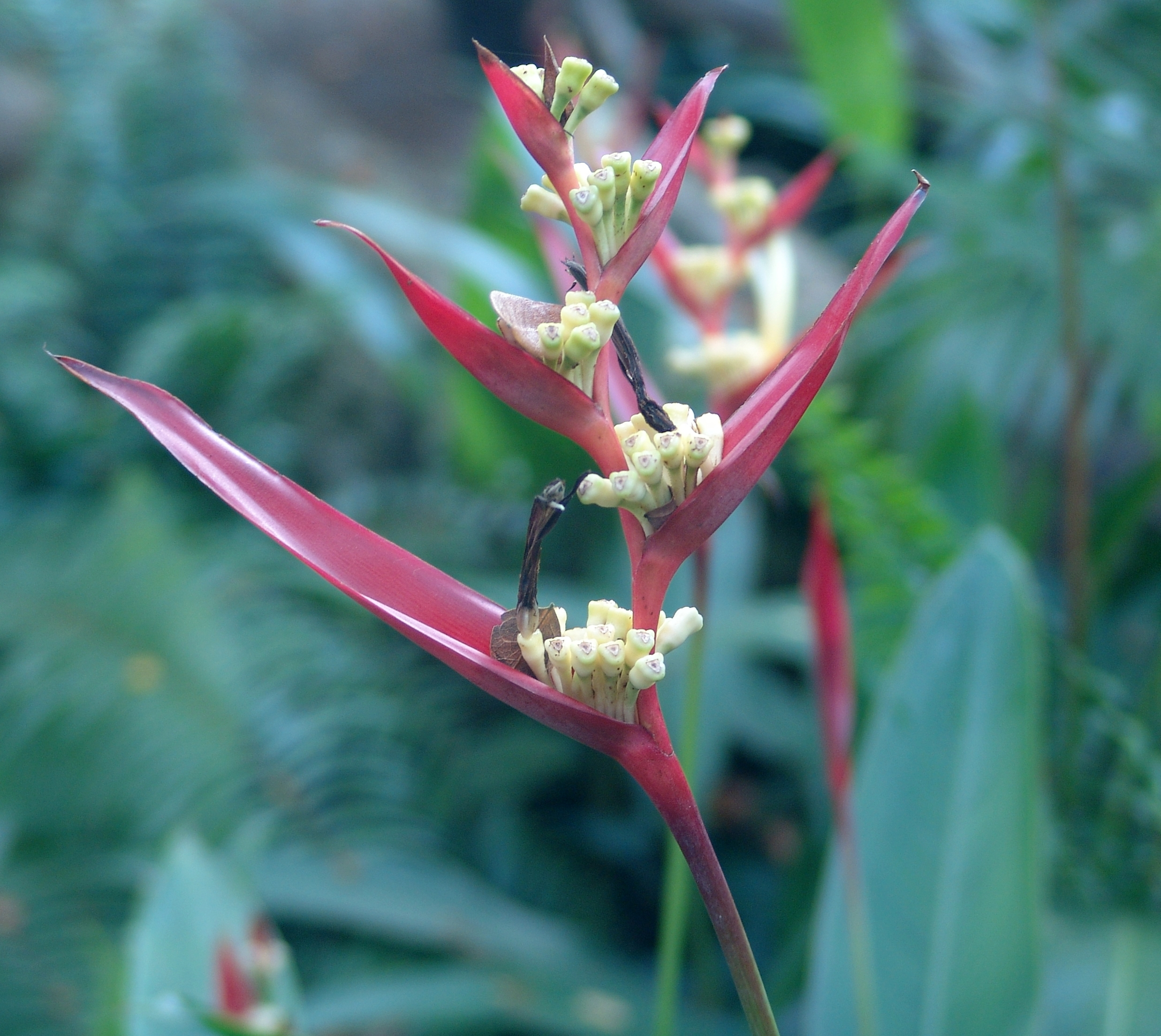

Scientific classification
- Kingdom: Plantae
- Clade: Tracheophytes
- Clade: Angiosperms
- Clade: Monocots
- Clade: Commelinids
- Order: Zingiberales
- Family: Heliconiaceae
- Genus: Heliconia
- Species: H. burleana

Binomial name
- Heliconia burleana Abalo & G.L.Morales

= Heliconia burleana =

Species of plant

Heliconia burleana is a species of plant in the family Heliconiaceae. It is native to Ecuador, Colombia and Peru. Its natural habitat is subtropical or tropical moist montane forest.
