= Heliconia peckenpaughii =

Conservation status
- Vulnerable (IUCN 3.1)

Scientific classification
- Kingdom: Plantae
- Clade: Tracheophytes
- Clade: Angiosperms
- Clade: Monocots
- Clade: Commelinids
- Order: Zingiberales
- Family: Heliconiaceae
- Genus: Heliconia
- Species: H. peckenpaughii

Binomial name
- Heliconia peckenpaughii Abalo & G.L.Morales

Species of flowering plant

Heliconia peckenpaughii is a species of plant in the family Heliconiaceae. It is endemic to Ecuador. Its natural habitat is subtropical or tropical moist montane forest.
