= Heliconia angelica =

Scientific classification
- Kingdom: Plantae
- Clade: Tracheophytes
- Clade: Angiosperms
- Clade: Monocots
- Clade: Commelinids
- Order: Zingiberales
- Family: Heliconiaceae
- Genus: Heliconia
- Species: H. angelica

Binomial name
- Heliconia angelica Abalo & G.L.Morales

Species of flowering plant

Heliconia angelica is a species of plant in the family Heliconiaceae. It is endemic to Ecuador. Its natural habitat is subtropical or tropical moist montane forest. The plant was named "angelica" because of the resemblance of the flower bracts to the wings of angels.
