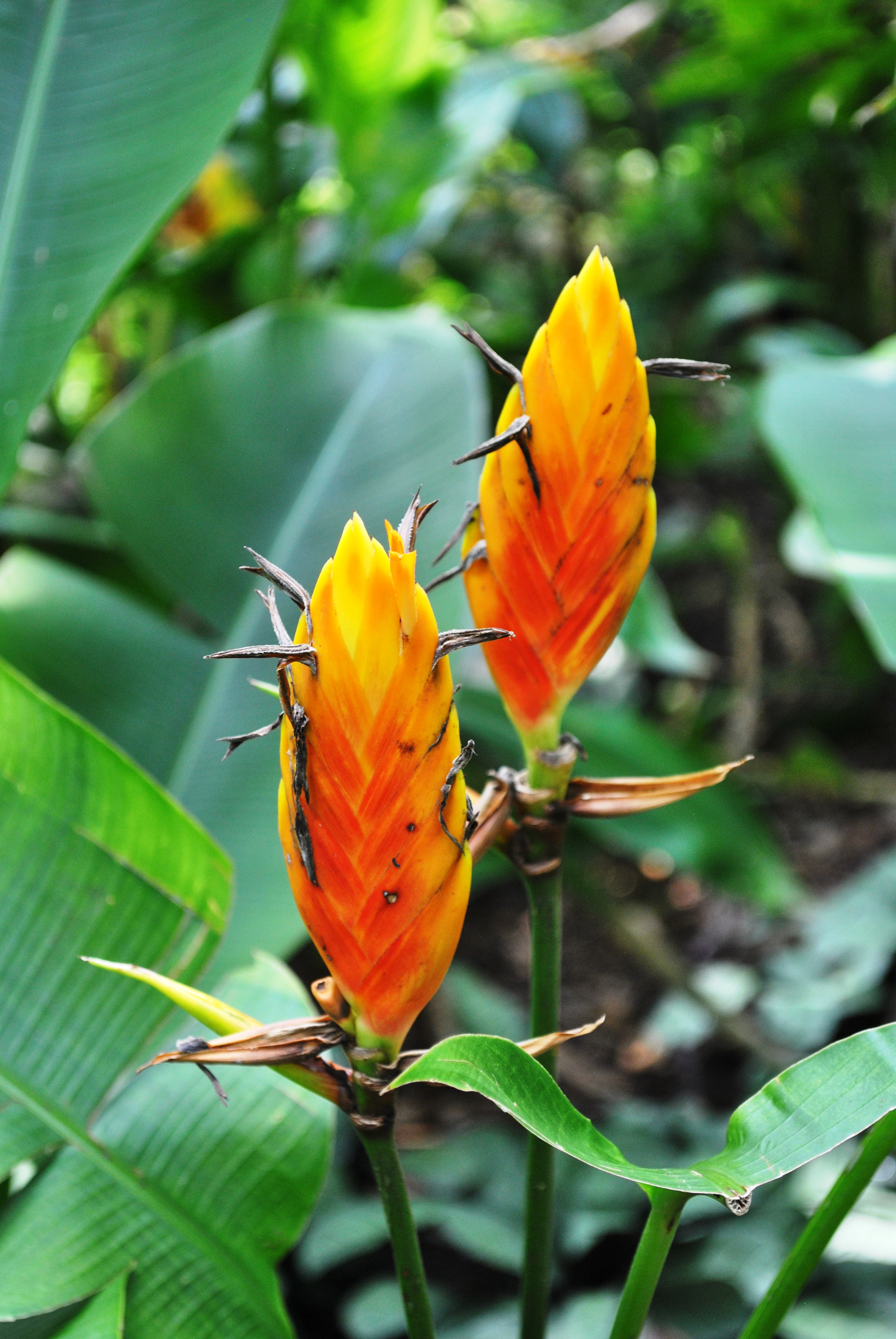

Scientific classification
- Kingdom: Plantae
- Clade: Tracheophytes
- Clade: Angiosperms
- Clade: Monocots
- Clade: Commelinids
- Order: Zingiberales
- Family: Heliconiaceae
- Genus: Heliconia
- Species: H. episcopalis

Binomial name
- Heliconia episcopalis Vell.

Synonyms
- Bihai episcopalis (Vell.) Kunze; Bihai ferdinando-coburgi (Szyszyl. ex Wawra) Kuntze; Heliconia biflora Eicheler ex. Petersen; Heliconia ferdinando-coburgi Szyszyl. ex Wawra; Heliconia thyrsoidea Mart. ex Petersen

= Heliconia episcopalis =

Species of plant

Heliconia episcopalis is a species of plant in the family Heliconiaceae. It is an erect herb typically growing up to 2 meters tall, native to the Amazon rainforest, in Colombia, Venezuela, Guyana, French Guiana, Suriname, Brazil, Ecuador, and Peru in South America.

== Uses ==
Heliconia episcopalis is a popular ornamental plant in hot regions with a humid climate.
