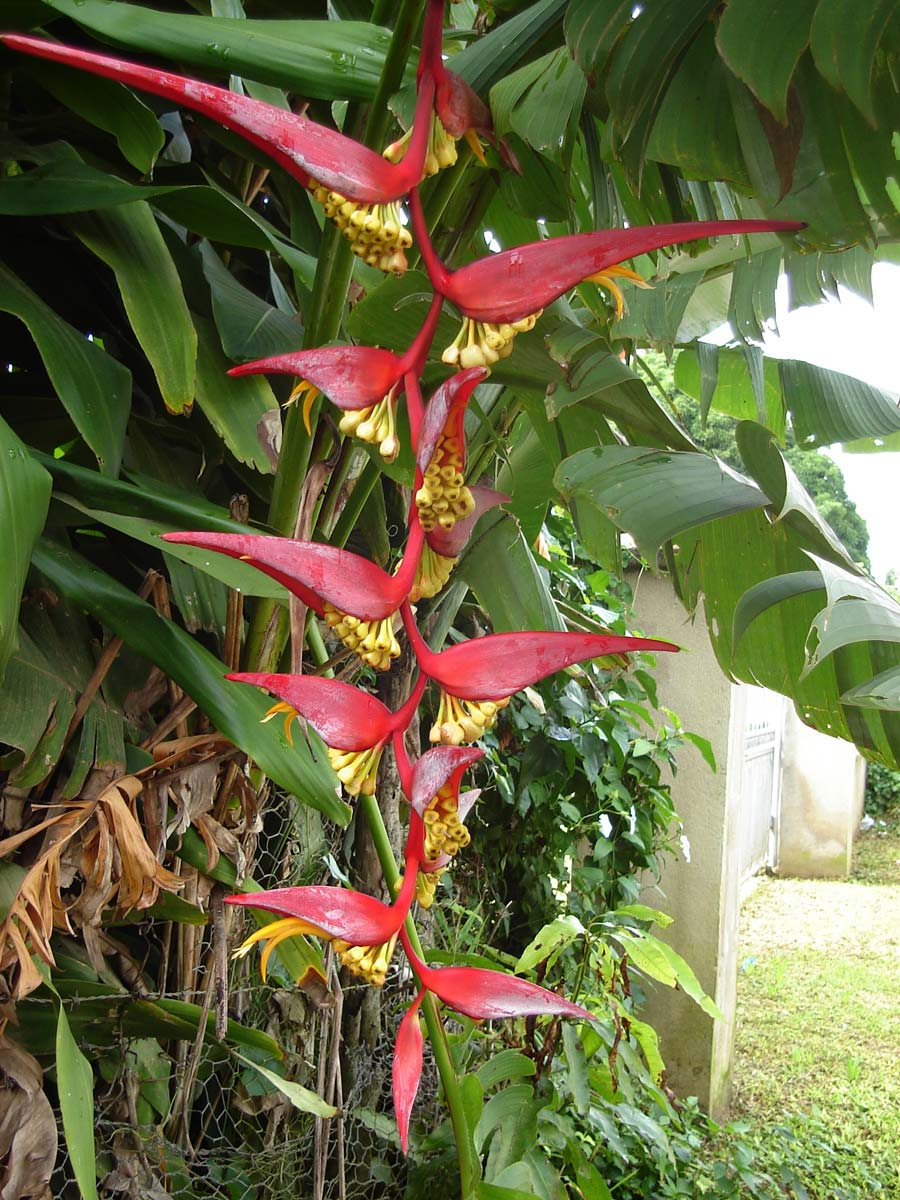

Scientific classification
- Kingdom: Plantae
- Clade: Tracheophytes
- Clade: Angiosperms
- Clade: Monocots
- Clade: Commelinids
- Order: Zingiberales
- Family: Heliconiaceae
- Genus: Heliconia
- Species: H. collinsiana

Binomial name
- Heliconia collinsiana Griggs

Synonyms
- Bihai collinsiana (Griggs) Griggs

= Heliconia collinsiana =

Species of plant

Heliconia collinsiana (platanillo) of family Heliconiaceae is an erect herb typically growing 10–15 feet (3.0–4.6 m) tall, native to Guatemala, Honduras, El Salvador, Nicaragua and southern Mexico (Chiapas, Oaxaca, Guerrero, Tabasco, Nayarit, Jalisco, Veracruz, Michoacán).

== Uses ==
Heliconia collinsiana is a popular ornamental plant in hot regions with a humid climate. The fruits are showy, first yellow and then ripening to a bright purple-blue. It can be cultivated outdoors in frost-free areas of Southern California. It is usually grown in full sun to light shade (50% sun) and in rich, well-drained soils.
