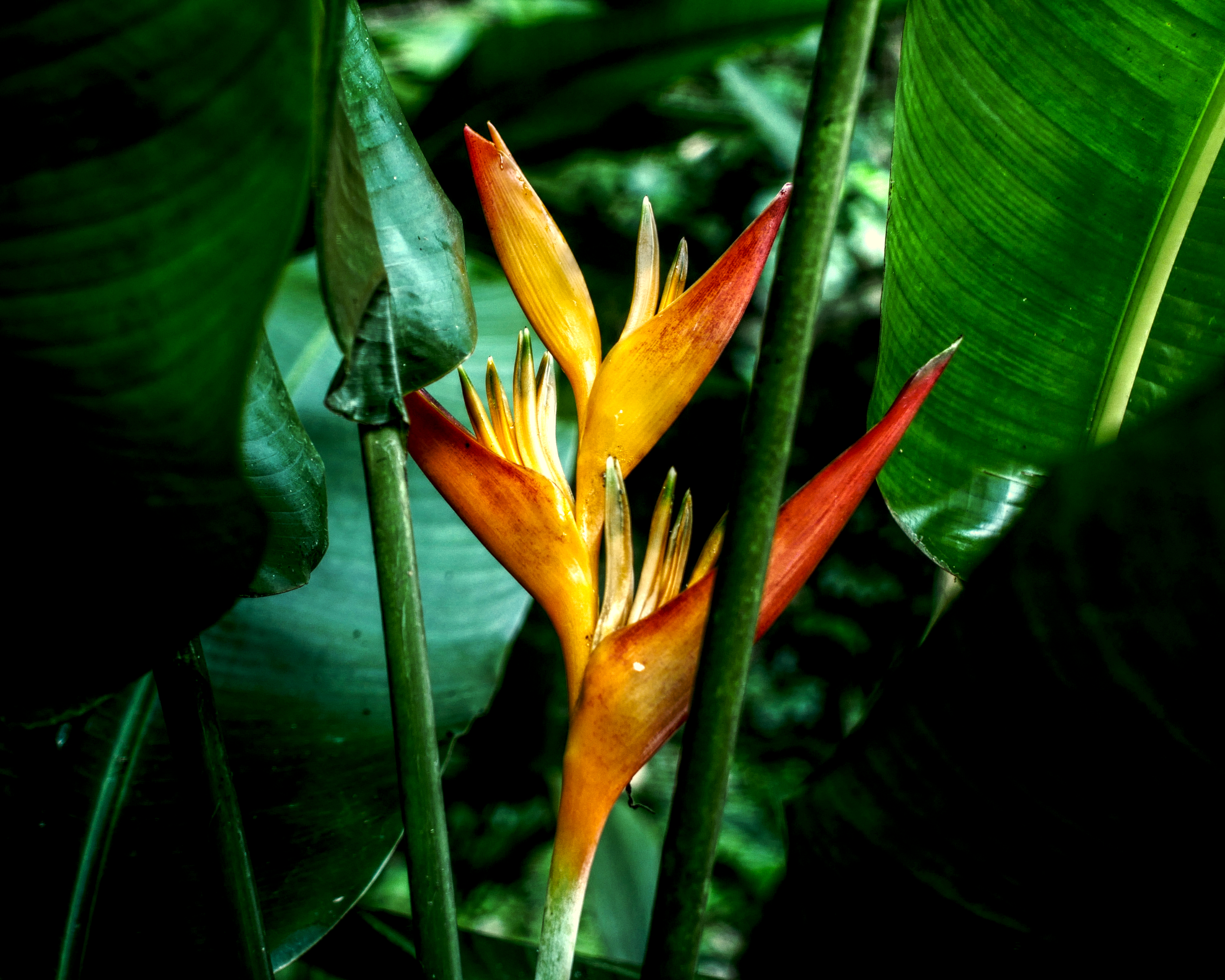

Scientific classification
- Kingdom: Plantae
- Clade: Tracheophytes
- Clade: Angiosperms
- Clade: Monocots
- Clade: Commelinids
- Order: Zingiberales
- Family: Heliconiaceae
- Genus: Heliconia
- Species: H. psittacorum

Binomial name
- Heliconia psittacorum L.f.

Synonyms
- Bihai cannoidea (A.Rich.) Kuntze; Bihai humilis (Aubl.) Griggs; Bihai psittacorum (L.f.) Kuntze; Bihai sylvestris Gleason; Heliconia andrewsii Klotzsch; Heliconia bahiensis Barreiros; Heliconia ballia Rich.; Heliconia brasiliensis var. concolor Petersen; Heliconia cannoidea A.Rich.; Heliconia goiasensis Barreiros; Heliconia hirsuta var. cannoidea (A.Rich.) Baker; Heliconia humilis (Aubl.) Jacq.; Heliconia marantifolia G.Shaw; Heliconia psittacorum var. rhizomatosa Aristeg.; Heliconia psittacorum var. robusta Eichler ex Petersen; Heliconia psittacorum var. spathacea Eichler ex Petersen; Heliconia schomburgkiana Klotzsch; Heliconia swartziana Roem. & Schult.; Heliconia sylvestris (Gleason) L.B.Sm.; Musa humilis Aubl.

= Heliconia psittacorum =

Species of flowering plant

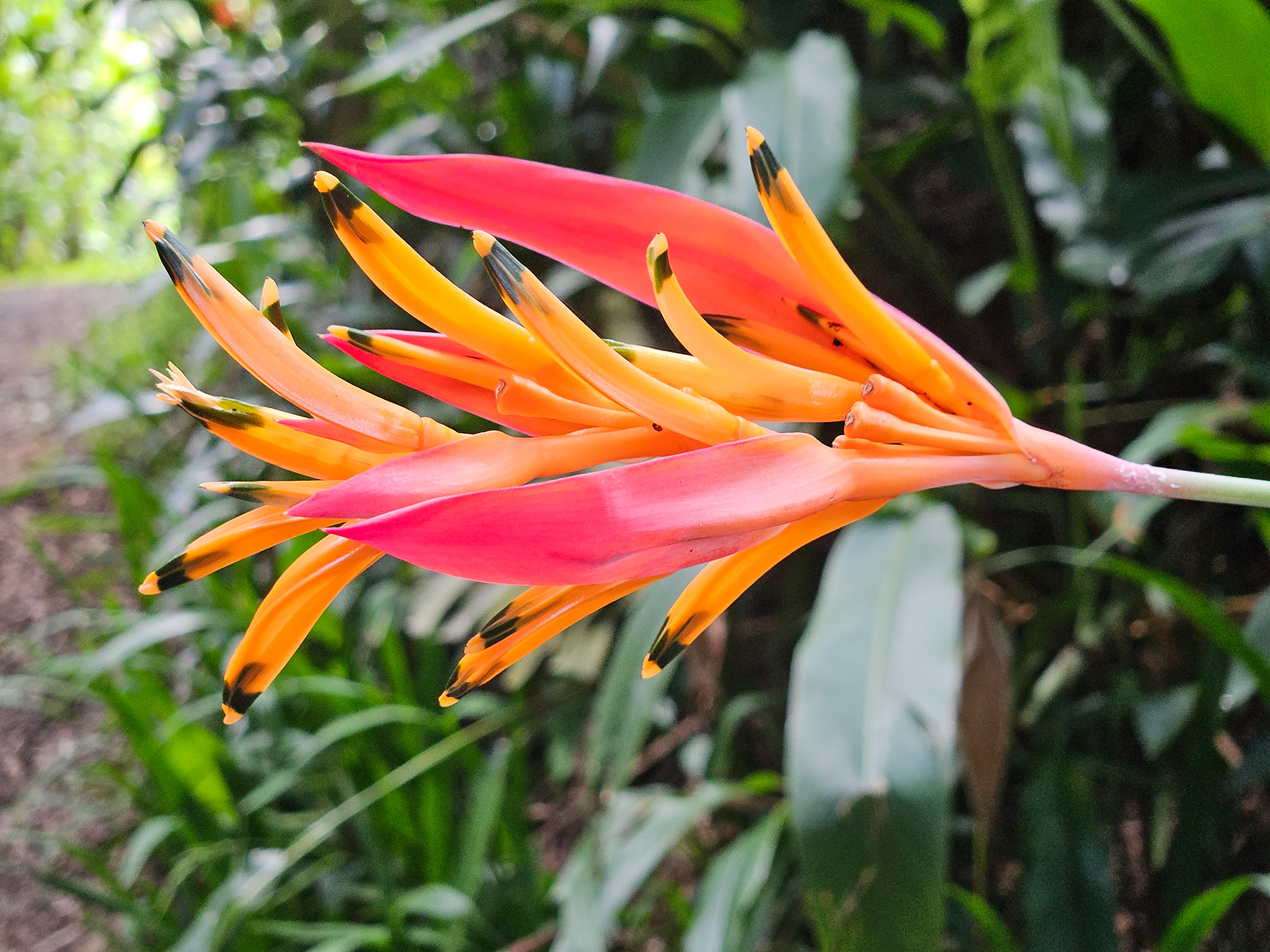
Heliconia psittacorum L.f. (Hawaii, Maui)

Heliconia psittacorum (parrot's beak, parakeet flower, parrot's flower, parrot's plantain, false bird-of-paradise) is a perennial herb native to the Caribbean and South America. It is considered native to French Guiana, Guyana, Suriname, Venezuela, Colombia, Bolivia, Brazil, Paraguay, Panama and Trinidad and Tobago. It is reportedly naturalized in Gambia, Thailand, Puerto Rico, Hispaniola, Jamaica and the Lesser Antilles. It is often cultivated as a tropical ornamental plant in regions outside its native range.

== Description ==
Heliconia psittacorum can grow 1 - 2 meters tall. The leaves are lanceolate to elliptical, and are similar to banana leaves.

The flower has both male parts (anthers) and female parts (stigma and pistil), also referred to as a monoecious angiosperm. The inflorescence is erect, consisting of red bracts and pale-yellow tubular flowers.
