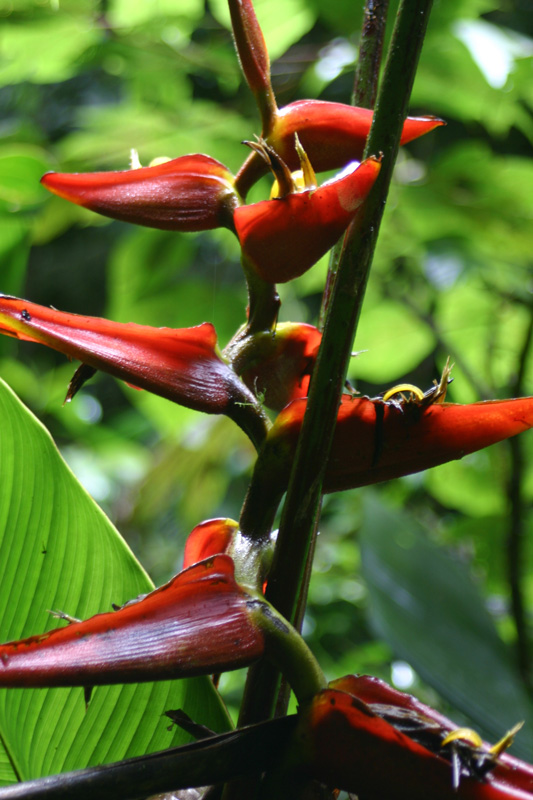
- H. tortuosa in Monteverde, Costa Rica

Scientific classification
- Kingdom: Plantae
- Clade: Tracheophytes
- Clade: Angiosperms
- Clade: Monocots
- Clade: Commelinids
- Order: Zingiberales
- Family: Heliconiaceae
- Genus: Heliconia
- Species: H. tortuosa

Binomial name
- Heliconia tortuosa Griggs

Synonyms
- Bihai tortuosa (Griggs) Griggs

= Heliconia tortuosa =

Species of flowering plant

Heliconia tortuosa is an herbaceous tropical perennial commonly found in secondary succession in montane forests in Central America and southern Mexico (Chiapas and Tabasco). It is moderately shade tolerant. It has also been widely cultivated as a garden plant for its showy, usually twisted (hence the name tortuosa) inflorescences.

Heliconia tortuosa is selective with its pollination, allowing only green hermit and violet sabrewing hummingbirds to pollinate its flowers.
