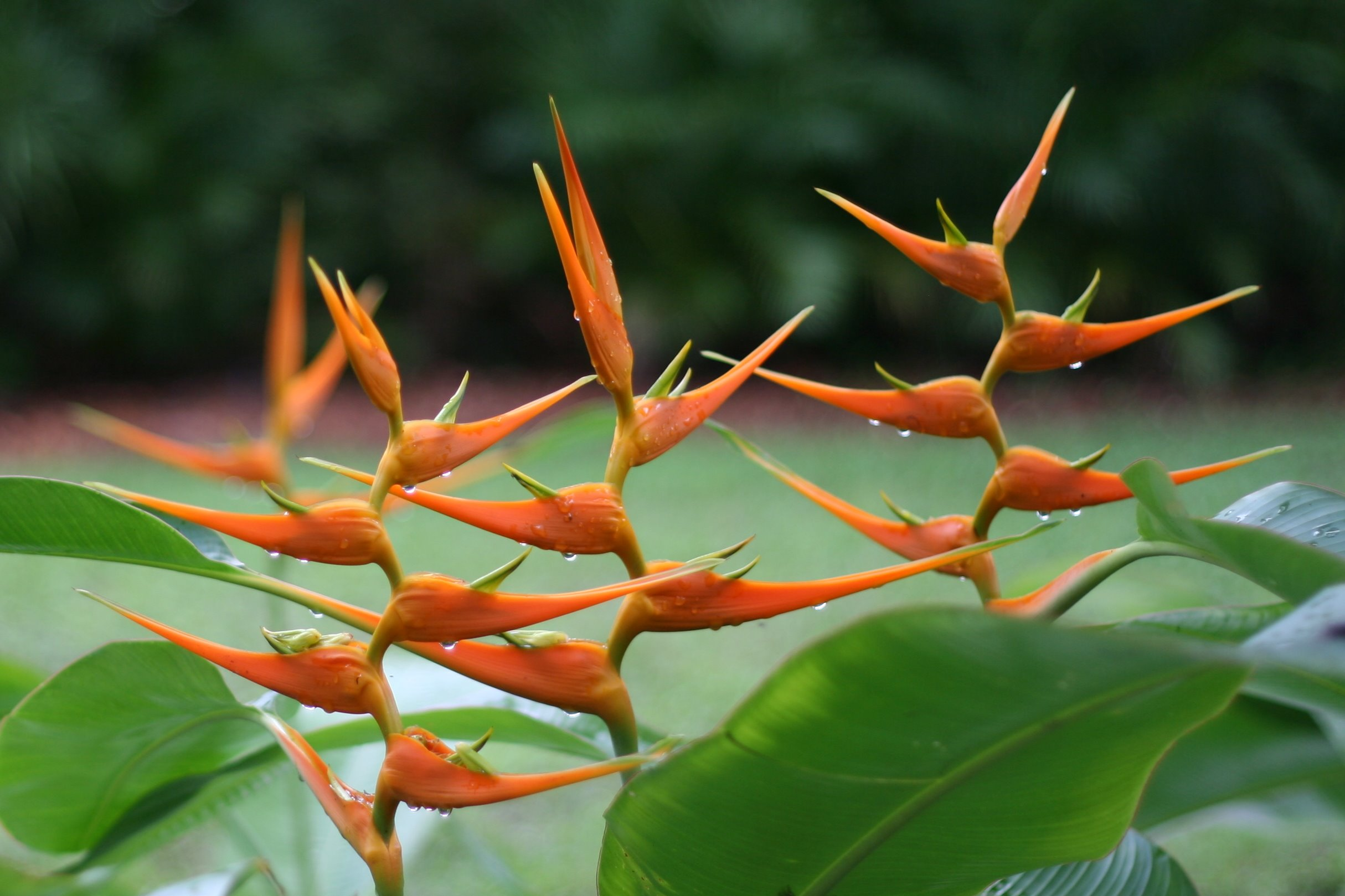

Scientific classification
- Kingdom: Plantae
- Clade: Tracheophytes
- Clade: Angiosperms
- Clade: Monocots
- Clade: Commelinids
- Order: Zingiberales
- Family: Heliconiaceae
- Genus: Heliconia
- Species: H. latispatha

Binomial name
- Heliconia latispatha Benth.

Synonyms
- Bihai latispatha (Benth.) Griggs; Heliconia aequatoriensis Loes.

= Heliconia latispatha =

Species of plant

Heliconia latispatha (expanded lobsterclaw) is a plant species native to southern Mexico (Tabasco, Oaxaca, Chiapas, Campeche), Central America and northern South America (Colombia, Venezuela, Ecuador and Peru) and naturalized in Florida and Jamaica. It is an herbaceous perennial up to 4 m tall, with leaves resembling those of bananas. The inflorescence is erect, up to 45 cm long, with red or orange bracts subtending green, yellow or orange flowers.
