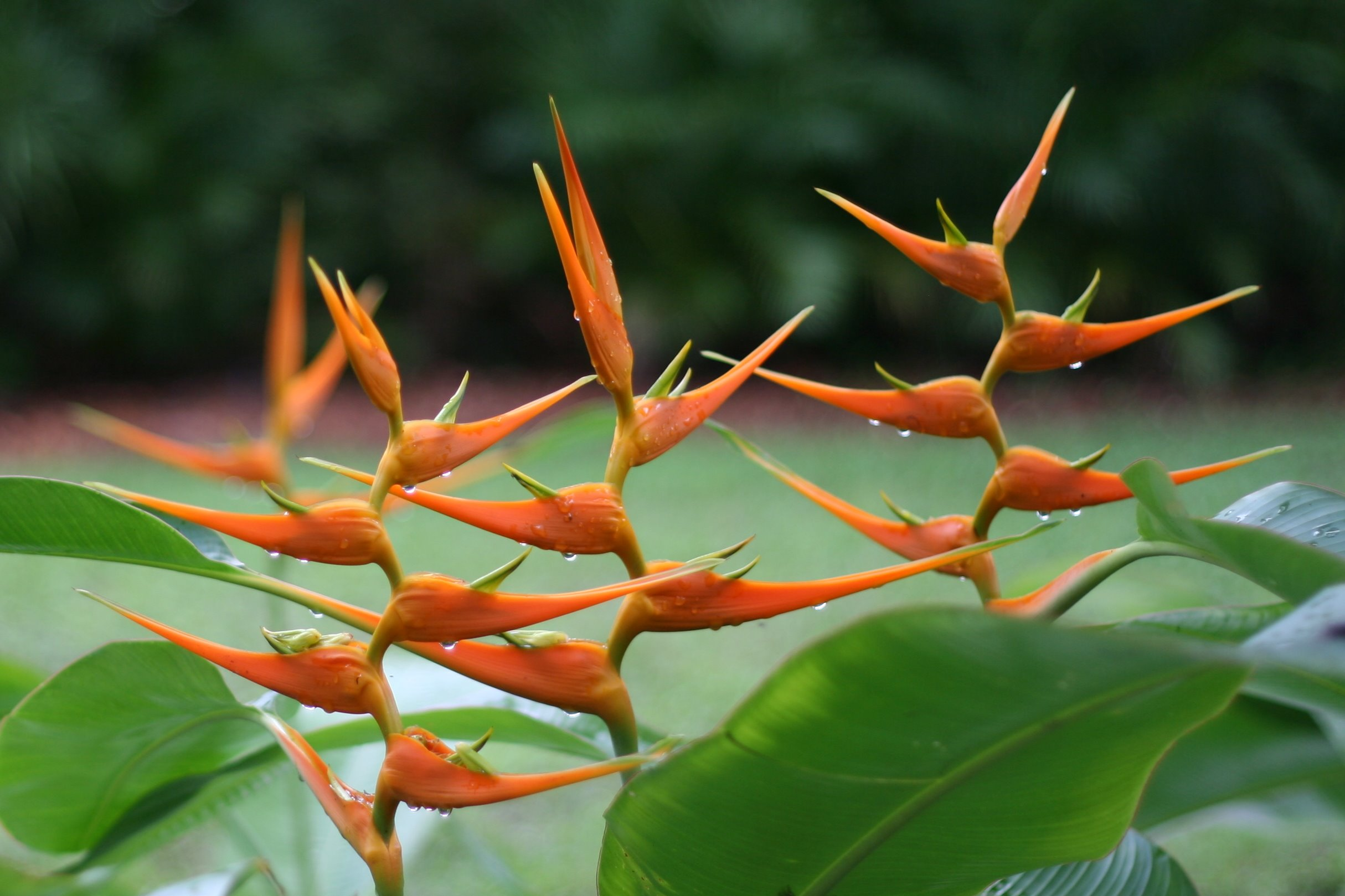
- Heliconia latispatha inflorescences

Scientific classification
- Kingdom: Plantae
- Clade: Tracheophytes
- Clade: Angiosperms
- Clade: Monocots
- Clade: Commelinids
- Order: Zingiberales
- Family: Heliconiaceae; Vines
- Genus: Heliconia; L.

Synonyms
- Bihai Mill.; Heliconiopsis Miq.

= Heliconia =

Genus of plants

Heliconia is a genus of flowering plants in the monotypic family Heliconiaceae. Most of the 194 known species are native to the tropical Americas, but a few are indigenous to certain islands of the western Pacific and Maluku in Indonesia. Many species of Heliconia are found in the tropical forests of these regions. Most species are listed as either vulnerable or data deficient by the IUCN Red List of threatened species. Several species are widely cultivated as ornamentals, and a few are naturalized in Florida, Gambia, and Thailand.

Common names for the genus include lobster-claws, toucan beak, wild plantain, or false bird-of-paradise; the last term refers to their close similarity to the bird-of-paradise flowers in the genus Strelitzia. Collectively, these plants are also simply referred to as "heliconias".

Heliconia originated in the Late Eocene (39 Ma) and are the oldest known clade of hummingbird-pollinated plants.

== Description ==
These herbaceous plants range from 0.5 to nearly 4.5 m (1.5–15 ft) tall, depending on the species.

=== Leaves ===
The simple leaves of these plants are 15–300 cm (6 in–10 ft). They are characteristically long, oblong, alternate, or growing opposite one another on non-woody petioles often longer than the leaf, often forming large clumps with age. The leaves in different positions on the plant have a different absorption potential of sunlight for photosynthesis when exposed to different degrees of sunlight. They also look like lobster claws.

=== Flower ===
Their flowers are produced on long, erect or drooping panicles, and consist of brightly colored, waxy bracts, with small true flowers peeping out from the bracts. The growth habit of heliconias is similar to Canna, Strelitzia, and bananas, to which they are related. The flowers can be hues of reds, oranges, yellows, and greens, and are subtended by brightly colored bracts.

The flowers' shape often limits pollination to a subset of the hummingbirds in the region. They also produce ample nectar that attract these birds.

=== Seeds ===
Fruits are blue-purple when ripe and primarily bird dispersed. Studies of post-dispersal seed survival showed that seed size was not a determinant. The highest amount of seed predation came from mammals.

== Taxonomy ==
Heliconia is the only genus in the monotypic family Heliconiaceae. The genus was formerly included in the family Musaceae, which includes the bananas (e.g. Musa, Ensete and so on). In 1998 the Angiosperm Phylogeny Group recognised the family Heliconiaceae in the APG system, and included it in the order Zingiberales as a sister family to Musaceae. This position is maintained in the most recent review of the APG system, APG IV, published in 2016.

=== Etymology ===
The generic name Heliconia was given by Carl Linnaeus in 1771 from the Greek word Ἑλικώνιος Helikṓnios from Ἑλικών Helikṓn after Mount Helicon in Boeotia, central Greece.

Cladogram: Phylogeny of Zingiberales

- Zingiberales
  - - - Zingiberineae
        - Zingiberariae
          - Zingiberaceae
          - Costaceae
        - Cannariae
          - Cannaceae
          - Marantaceae
      - - Strelitziineae
          - Lowiaceae
          - Strelitziaceae
        - Heliconiaceae
  - - Musaceae

== Species ==
Species accepted by Kew Botanic Gardens

Image	Scientific name	Distribution
	Heliconia abaloi	Colombia
	Heliconia acuminata	South America
	Heliconia adflexa	S Mexico, Guatemala, Honduras
	Heliconia aemygdiana	South America
	Heliconia albicosta	Costa Rica
	Heliconia angelica	Ecuador
	Heliconia angusta	SE Brazil
	Heliconia apparicioi	Ecuador, Peru, NW Brazil
	Heliconia arrecta	Colombia
	Heliconia atratensis	Colombia
	Heliconia atropurpurea	Colombia, Panama, Costa Rica
	Heliconia aurantiaca	S Mexico, Central America
	Heliconia auriculata	Bahia
	Heliconia badilloi	Colombia
	Heliconia barryana	Chiriquí
	Heliconia beckneri	Costa Rica
	Heliconia bella	Panama
	Heliconia berguidoi	E Panama
	Heliconia berriziana	Colombia
	Heliconia berryi	Napo, Ecuador
	Heliconia bihai	West Indies, N South America
	Heliconia bourgaeana	S Mexico, Central America
	Heliconia brachyantha	Panama, Colombia, Venezuela
	Heliconia brenneri	Ecuador
	Heliconia burleana	Colombia, Ecuador, Peru
	Heliconia caltheaphylla	Costa Rica
	Heliconia caquetensis	Colombia
	Heliconia carajaensis	Pará
	Heliconia caribaea	West Indies
	Heliconia carmelae	Colombia
	Heliconia chartacea	N South America
	Heliconia chrysocraspeda	Colombia
	Heliconia clinophila	Costa Rica, Panama
	Heliconia colgantea	Costa Rica, Panama
	Heliconia collinsiana	S Mexico, Central America
	Heliconia combinata	Colombia
	Heliconia cordata	Colombia, Ecuador
	Heliconia crassa	Guatemala
	Heliconia cristata	Panama
	Heliconia cucullata	Costa Rica, Panama
	Heliconia curtispatha	Colombia, Ecuador, Central America
	Heliconia danielsiana	Costa Rica, Panama
	Heliconia darienensis	Colombia, Panama
	Heliconia dasyantha	Suriname, French Guiana
	Heliconia densiflora	Trinidad, N South America
	Heliconia dielsiana	NW South America
	Heliconia donstonea	Colombia, Ecuador
	Heliconia episcopalis	South America
	Heliconia estherae	Colombia
	Heliconia estiletioides	Colombia
	Heliconia excelsa	Napo
	Heliconia farinosa	SE Brazil, NE Argentina
	Heliconia faunorum	Panama
	Heliconia fernandezii	Antioquia, Colombia
	Heliconia × flabellata	Ecuador
	Heliconia foreroi	Colombia
	Heliconia fragilis	Colombia
	Heliconia fredberryana	Imbabura
	Heliconia fugax	Peru
	Heliconia gaiboriana	Los Ríos
	Heliconia gigantea	Colombia
	Heliconia gloriosa	Peru
	Heliconia gracilis	Costa Rica
	Heliconia griggsiana	Colombia, Ecuador
	Heliconia harlingii	Ecuador
	Heliconia hirsuta	Central + South America, Trinidad
	Heliconia holmquistiana	Colombia
	Heliconia huilensis	Colombia
	Heliconia ignescens	Costa Rica, Panama
	Heliconia imbricata	Costa Rica, Panama, Colombia
	Heliconia impudica	Ecuador
	Heliconia indica	Papuasia, Maluku
	Heliconia intermedia	Colombia
	Heliconia irrasa	Costa Rica, Panama, Nicaragua
	Heliconia julianii	N South America
	Heliconia juruana	Ecuador, Peru, NW Brazil
	Heliconia kautzkiana	Espírito Santo
	Heliconia lanata	Solomon Islands
	Heliconia lankesteri	Costa Rica, Panama
	Heliconia lasiorachis	Colombia, Peru, NW Brazil
	Heliconia latispatha	from S Mexico to Peru
	Heliconia laufao	Samoa
	Heliconia laxa	Colombia
	Heliconia lentiginosa	Antioquia
	Heliconia librata	S Mexico, Central America
	Heliconia lingulata	Peru, Bolivia
	Heliconia litana	Imbabura
	Heliconia longiflora	Colombia, Ecuador, Central America
	Heliconia longissima	Colombia
	Heliconia lophocarpa	Costa Rica, Panama
	Heliconia lourteigiae	South America
	Heliconia lozanoi	Colombia
	Heliconia luciae	B Amazonas
	Heliconia lutea	Panama
	Heliconia luteoviridis	Colombia
	Heliconia lutheri	Ecuador
	Heliconia maculata	Panama
	Heliconia magnifica	Panama
	Heliconia × mantenensis	Minas Gerais
	Heliconia marginata	N South America, S Central America
	Heliconia mariae	NW South America, Central America
	Heliconia markiana	Ecuador
	Heliconia marthiasiae	S Mexico, Central America
	Heliconia meridensis	Colombia, Venezuela
	Heliconia metallica	N South America, Central America
	Heliconia monteverdensis	Costa Rica
	Heliconia mooreana	Guerrero
	Heliconia mucilagina	Colombia
	Heliconia mucronata	Venezuela, NW Brazil
	Heliconia mutisiana	Colombia
	Heliconia nariniensis	Colombia, Ecuador
	Heliconia necrobracteata	Panama
	Heliconia × nickeriensis	Suriname, French Guiana
	Heliconia nigripraefixa	Colombia, Ecuador, Panama
	Heliconia nitida	Colombia
	Heliconia nubigena	Costa Rica, Panama
	Heliconia nutans	Costa Rica, Panama
	Heliconia obscura	Ecuador, Peru
	Heliconia obscuroides	Colombia, Ecuador, Peru
	Heliconia oleosa	Colombia
	Heliconia orthotricha	Colombia, Ecuador, Peru
	Heliconia osaensis	Colombia, Central America
	Heliconia paka	Fiji
	Heliconia paludigena	Ecuador
	Heliconia papuana	New Guinea
	Heliconia pardoi	Ecuador
	Heliconia pastazae	Ecuador
	Heliconia peckenpaughii	Napo
	Heliconia pendula	Guiana, Fr Guiana, NE Brazil
	Heliconia penduloides	Peru
	Heliconia peteriana	Ecuador
	Heliconia × plagiotropa	Ecuador
	Heliconia platystachys	NW South America, S Central America
	Heliconia pogonantha	NW South America, S Central America
	Heliconia pruinosa	Peru
	Heliconia pseudoaemygdiana	Rio de Janeiro
	Heliconia psittacorum	N South America, Panama, Trinidad
	Heliconia ramonensis	Costa Rica, Panama
	Heliconia × rauliniana	Venezuela
	Heliconia regalis	Colombia, Ecuador
	Heliconia reptans	Colombia
	Heliconia reticulata	NW South America, S Central America
	Heliconia revoluta	Colombia, Venezuela, NW Brazil
	Heliconia rhodantha	Colombia
	Heliconia richardiana	NE South America
	Heliconia rigida	Colombia
	Heliconia riopalenquensis	Ecuador
	Heliconia rivularis	São Paulo, Brazil
	Heliconia robertoi	Colombia
	Heliconia robusta	Peru, Bolivia
	Heliconia rodriguensis	Venezuela
	Heliconia rodriguezii	Costa Rica
	Heliconia rostrata	Colombia, Ecuador, Peru, Bolivia
	Heliconia samperiana	Colombia
	Heliconia sanctae-martae	Sierra Nevada de Santa Marta
	Heliconia sanctae-theresae	Antioquia
	Heliconia santaremensis	Pará
	Heliconia sarapiquensis	Costa Rica, Panama
	Heliconia scarlatina	Colombia, Panama, Peru
	Heliconia schiedeana	Mexico
	Heliconia schumanniana	Colombia, Ecuador, Peru, N Brazil
	Heliconia sclerotricha	Ecuador
	Heliconia secunda	Costa Rica, Nicaragua
	Heliconia sessilis	Panama
	Heliconia signa-hispanica	Colombia
	Heliconia solomonensis	Solomon Islands, Bismarck Archipelago
	Heliconia spathocircinata	South America, Panama, Trinidad
	Heliconia spiralis	Colombia
	Heliconia spissa	S Mexico, Central America
	Heliconia standleyi	Ecuador, Peru
	Heliconia stella-maris	Colombia
	Heliconia stilesii	Costa Rica, Panama
	Heliconia stricta	N South America
	Heliconia subulata	South America
	Heliconia tacarcunae	Panama
	Heliconia talamancana	Costa Rica, Panama
	Heliconia tandayapensis	Ecuador
	Heliconia tenebrosa	Colombia, NE Peru, NW Brazil
	Heliconia terciopela	Colombia
	Heliconia thomasiana	Panama
	Heliconia timothei	NE Peru, NW Brazil
	Heliconia titanum	Colombia
	Heliconia tortuosa	S Mexico, Central America
	Heliconia trichocarpa	Costa Rica, Panama, Colombia
	Heliconia tridentata	Colombia
	Heliconia triflora	B Amazonas
	Heliconia umbrophila	Costa Rica
	Heliconia uxpanapensis	Veracruz
	Heliconia vaginalis	Costa Rica, Panama, Colombia, Ecuador
	Heliconia vellerigera	Ecuador, Peru
	Heliconia velutina	Colombia, Ecuador, Peru, NW Brazil
	Heliconia venusta	Colombia, Ecuador
	Heliconia villosa	Venezuela
	Heliconia virginalis	Ecuador
	Heliconia wagneriana	Central America, N South America, Trinidad
	Heliconia willisiana	Pichincha
	Heliconia wilsonii	Costa Rica, Panama
	Heliconia xanthovillosa	Panama
	Heliconia zebrina	Peru

== Distribution and habitat ==
Most of the 194 known species are native to the tropical Americas, but a few are indigenous to certain islands of the western Pacific and Maluku. Many species of Heliconia are found in the tropical forests of these regions. Several species are widely cultivated as ornamentals, and a few are naturalized in Florida, Gambia and Thailand.

== Ecology ==
Heliconias are an important food source for forest hummingbirds, especially the hermits (Phathornithinae), some of which – such as the rufous-breasted hermit (Glaucis hirsuta) – also use the plant for nesting. The Honduran white bat (Ectophylla alba) also lives in tents it makes from heliconia leaves.

=== Bats ===
==== Pollination ====
Although Heliconia are almost exclusively pollinated by hummingbirds, some bat pollination has been found to occur. Heliconia solomonensis is pollinated by the macroglossine bat Melonycteris woodfordi in the Solomon Islands. Heliconia solomonensis has green inflorescences and flowers that open at night, which is typical of bat pollinated plants. This bat is the only known nocturnal pollinator of Heliconia solomonensis.

==== Habitat ====
Many bats use Heliconia leaves for shelter. The Honduran white bat, Ectophylla alba, utilizes five species of Heliconia to make diurnal tent-shaped roosts. The bat cuts the side veins of the leaf extending from the midrib, causing the leaf to fold like a tent. This structure provides the bat with shelter from rain, sun, and predators. In addition, the stems of the Heliconia leaves are not strong enough to carry the weight of typical bat predators, so shaking of the leaf alerts roosting bats to presence of predators. The bats Artibeus anderseni and A. phaeotis form tents from the leaves of Heliconia in the same manner as the Honduran white bat. The neotropical disk-winged bat, Thyroptera tricolor, has suction disks on the wrists which allow it to cling to the smooth surfaces of the Heliconia leaves. This bat roosts head-up in the rolled young leaves of Heliconia plants.

=== Insects ===
Heliconias provide shelter for a diverse range of insects within their young rolled leaves and water-filled floral bracts. Insects that inhabit the rolled leaves often feed upon the inner surfaces of the leaf, such as beetles of the family Chrysomelidae. In bracts containing small amounts of water, fly larvae and beetles are the dominant inhabitants. In bracts with greater quantities of water the typical inhabitants are mosquito larva. Insects living in the bracts often feed on the bract tissue, nectar of the flower, flower parts, other insects, microorganisms, or detritus in the water contained in the bract (Siefert 1982). Almost all species of Hispini beetles that use rolled leaves are obligate herbivores of plants of the order of Zingiberales, which includes Heliconia. These beetles live in and feed from the rolled leaf, the stems, the inflorescences, or the unfurled mature leaves of the Heliconia plant. In addition, these beetles deposit their eggs on the leaf surface, petioles of immature leaves, or in the bracts of the Heliconia. Furthermore, some wasp species such as Polistes erythrocephalus build their nest on the protected underside of large leaves.

=== Hummingbirds ===
Hummingbirds are the main pollinators of heliconia flowers in many locations. The concurrent diversification of hummingbird-pollinated taxa in the order Zingiberales and the hummingbird family (Trochilidae: Phaethorninae) starting 18 million years ago supports the idea that these radiations have influenced one another through evolutionary time. At La Selva Research Station in Costa Rica, specific species of Heliconia were found to have specific hummingbird pollinators. These hummingbirds can be organized into two different groups: hermits and non-hermits. Hermits are the subfamily Phaethornithinae, consisting of the genera Anopetia, Eutoxeres, Glaucis, Phaethornis, Ramphodon, and Threnetes. Non-hermits are a catch-all group of other hummingbirds that often visit heliconias, comprising several clades (McGuire 2008). Hermits are generally traplining foragers; that is, individuals visit a repeated circuit of high-reward flowers instead of holding fixed territories Non-hermits are territorial over their Heliconia clumps, causing greater self-pollination. Hermits tend to have long curved bills while non-hermits tend to possess short straight bills, a morphological difference that likely spurred the divergence of these groups in the Miocene era. Characteristics of Heliconia flowers that select for either hermit or non-hermit pollinator specificity are degree of self-compatibility, flowering phenology, nectar production, color, and shape of flower. The hummingbird itself will choose the plants its feeds from on the basis of its beak shape, its perch on the plant, and its territory choice.

Hummingbird visits to the Heliconia flower do not affect its production of nectar. This may account for the flowers not having a consistent amount of nectar produced from flower to flower.

Different Heliconia species have different flowering seasons. This suggests that the species compete for pollinators. Many species of Heliconia, even the newly colonized species, are visited by many different pollinators.

== Cultivation ==
Several cultivars and hybrids have been selected for garden planting, including:

- H. psittacorum × H. spathocircinata, both species of South America, mainly Brazil
- H. × rauliniana = H. marginata (Venezuela) × H. bihai (Brazil)
- H. chartacea cv. 'Sexy Pink'

Most commonly grown landscape Heliconia species include H. augusta, H. bihai, H. brasiliensis, H. caribaea, H. latispatha, H. pendula, H. psittacorum, H. rostrata, H. schiediana, and H. wagneriana.

== Uses ==
Heliconias are grown for the florist's trade and as landscape plants. These plants do not grow well in cold, dry conditions. They are very drought intolerant, but can endure some soil flooding. Heliconias need an abundance of water, sunlight, and soils that are rich in humus in order to grow well. These flowers are grown in tropical regions all over the world as ornamental plants. The flower of H. psittacorum (parrot heliconia) is especially distinctive, its greenish-yellow flowers with black spots and red bracts reminiscent of the bright plumage of parrots.

== See also ==
- National Tropical Botanical Garden, designated a conservation center by the Heliconia Society International
