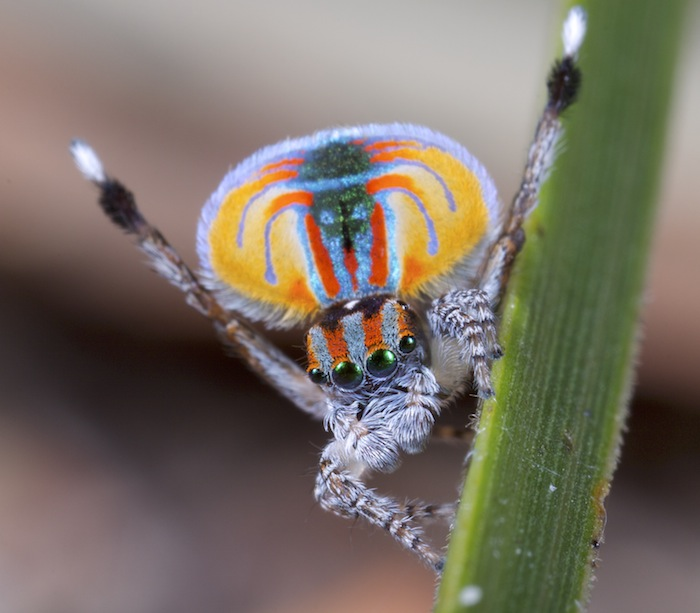
- Male Maratus volans and its colorful abdomen

Scientific classification
- Kingdom: Animalia
- Phylum: Arthropoda
- Subphylum: Chelicerata
- Class: Arachnida
- Order: Araneae
- Infraorder: Araneomorphae
- Family: Salticidae
- Subfamily: Salticinae
- Genus: Maratus; Karsch, 1878

Type species
- Maratus amabilis Karsch, 1878

Diversity
- >100 species (see text)

Synonyms
- Hypoblemum G. W. Peckham & E. G. Peckham, 1886; Lycidas Karsch, 1878; Saratus Otto & Hill, 2017

= Maratus =

Genus of spiders

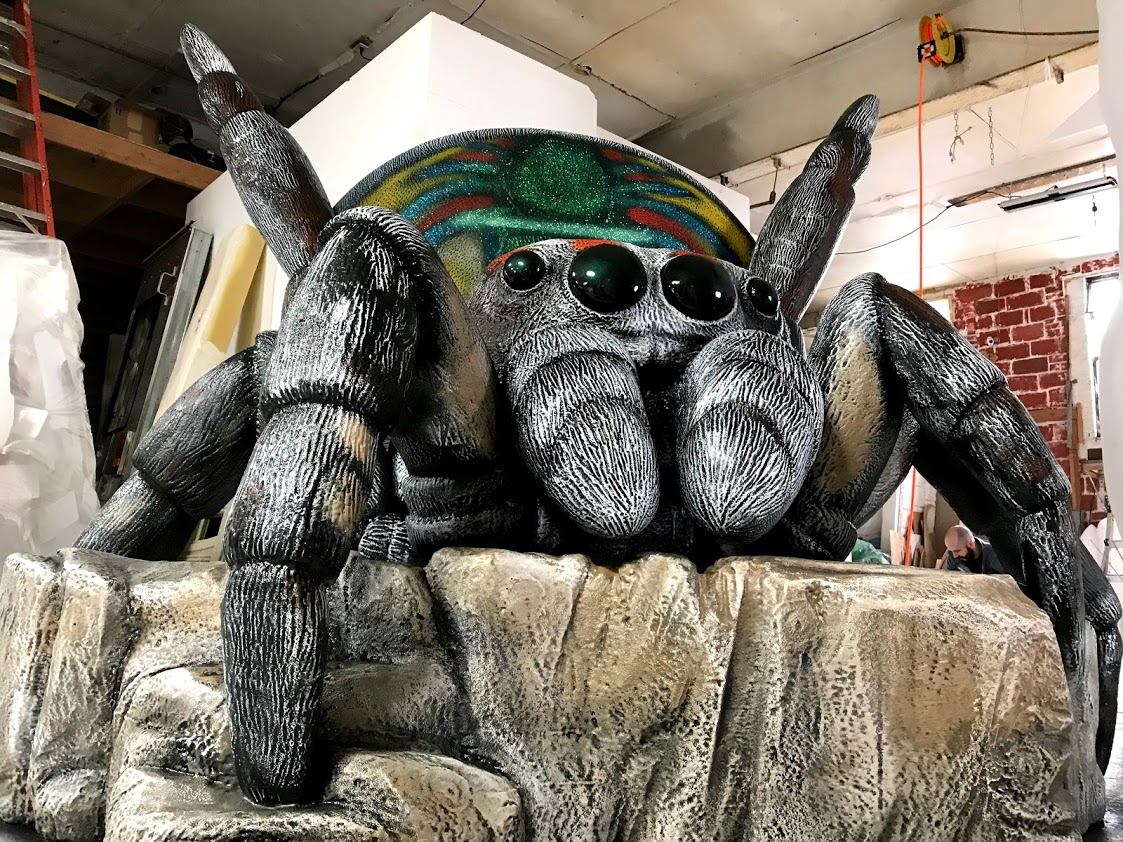
Peacock spider sculpture

Maratus is a spider genus of the family Salticidae (jumping spiders). These spiders are commonly referred to as peacock spiders due to the males' colorful and usually iridescent patterns on the upper surface of the abdomen, often enhanced with lateral flaps or bristles, which they display during courtship. Females lack these bright colors, being cryptic in appearance. In at least one species, Maratus vespertilio, the expansion of the flaps also occurs during ritualised contests between males. The males' displays and courtship dances are complex, involving visual and vibratory signals. All species of Maratus are found in Australia.

Several species in this genus were earlier classified in the genus Saitis, containing the Mediterranean Saitis barbipes, which is superficially similar to Maratus (colorful males with an enlarged third pair of legs). Saitis species in Australia have enlarged and fringed third legs, which they use for display, but do not raise their abdomens like Maratus.

M. furvus from China was described in 1992 in the genus Lycidas, and became part of Maratus when Lycidas was synonymized in 2012. It was moved to Euochin in 2023.

== Description ==
Maratus species are small spiders, with a total body length mostly around 4–5 mm (0.2 in), sometimes smaller, with a high degree of sexual dimorphism. They are known as peacock spiders, based on the peacock-like display of the dorsal (upper) surface of the abdomen (opisthosoma) of the males, on which has a "plate" or "fan" of usually brightly colored and highly iridescent scales and hairs, often forming patterns in which the foreground colors contrast with the iridescent background. In addition, "flaps" or dense fringes of hairs may occur at the sides of the abdomen, sometimes brightly colored. In both sexes, the abdomen is joined to the cephalothorax by a long and very flexible pedicel. This allows males to raise their abdomens, which may also be capable of being flattened and waved from side to side, thus emphasizing the appearance of the dorsal pattern. Not all species have colors that appear bright to human vision; Maratus vespertilio is relatively cryptically colored, with most iridescence on the lateral flaps. The abdominal display is used in courtship, and in at least one species, also in aggressive interactions with rival males. If the male continues his dance when the female is not interested, she often attempts to attack, kill, and feed on him; she may also do this after mating (sexual cannibalism). If the female has already mated, then she appears more aggressive and less receptive to other males' displays. This can also occur if the female simply was not impressed by the male (less vibrations or less leg waving). She has an antireceptivity signal that tells males she is not receptive. This serves a function to both the males and females. The males then stop wasting their energy on an unwilling female. The males' displays are likely to attract predators, so stopping the performance is likely to protect both the females and males from potential dangers. In almost all species, males have relatively long third legs, often brightly patterned, that are also used in courtship displays. Salticid spiders have excellent vision, with the ability to see in at least two colors: green and ultraviolet (UV). The male display includes vibratory signals in addition to visual ones. At least one species (Maratus fimbriatus) displays with its first pair of legs rather than its third pair. Some Maratus including Maratus calcitrans, Maratus digitatus and Maratus jactatus display with greatly enlarged and decorated spinnerets when their abdomen is elevated. One species from Cape Riche, Western Australia, in a region which is something of a hot-spot for Maratus species, does not use its abdomen in its display at all, instead using a combination of decorated third legs and its bright blue face and fluffy white pedipalps.

Male palpal bulbs are relatively simple in appearance, with a circular embolus, and are rather similar in different species. The palp usually has a simple retrolateral tibial apophysis with a blunt tip.

In contrast to the brightly coloured and distinctive males, females are cryptic or camouflaged in appearance, with mottled patterns of whitish and brownish scales. The epigyne is simple, with a pair of circular "windows" (fossae) to the front and a pair of oval spermathecae to the rear. The long and flexible pedicel allows females to rotate their abdomens by more than 180° during mating.

== Mechanisms used in colour production ==
Male Maratus species mostly display the brilliantly coloured upper surface of their abdomen, often with extensions and fringes, to the females in courtship dances. Colours are produced by two main methods using scales (or modified hairs). One mechanism uses pigments to produce reds, whites, and creams in barbed scales that help scatter light. To produce blues the spiders use arrays of nanostructures reflecting light of particular wavelengths, in the case of Maratus splendens a shiny, sometimes violet blue. The nanostructures are embedded in flat, convex, sac-like scales, amplifying reflected light, according to University of Groningen's Doekele Stavenga. This is the only animal where this kind of reflection has been shown. Stavenga compared Maratus colours with patterns on butterfly wings, the colors of flowers, and the feathers of the parotia bird. The blues produced by nanostructures in Maratus do not fade over time, unlike the normal pigmenting method. Other blue animals, like beetles, are rare but also use nanostructures. Nathan Morehouse of the University of Pittsburgh found Maratus volans have four different photoreceptors (tetrachromats) allowing them to see red, blue, green, and ultraviolet and also resolve the intricacies of the male's display designs.

== Taxonomy ==
The genus Maratus was first described by Ferdinand Karsch in 1878. Karsch was a curator at the Museum für Naturkunde, Berlin, and named spiders and other animals from preserved specimens collected by others. He described the species Maratus amabilis, the type of his new genus, on the basis of a single male specimen, whose origin was only recorded as "Australia". His short description mentioned the abdomen being flattened and quadrangular in shape, but otherwise did not refer to the characteristic abdominal "flaps". In a footnote, he also named Maratus amoenus (now M. volans). Marek Żabka in 1987 was the first to restore Karsch's two species of Maratus, and moving more previously described species to the genus in 1991. Maratus was greatly expanded in the 21st century, both by known species being moved to Maratus and by the description of new species. Most of the new species have been described by Jürgen C. Otto and David E. Hill.

Otto and Hill suggest that Maratus is closely related to the genus Saitis. Both are found in Australia, and in both genera, the males have elongated third legs and unmodified first legs.

=== Phylogeny ===
The relationships among Maratus and related genera are unclear, and many species await description. Otto and Hill synonymized Lycidas with Maratus) in 2012, recognising the type species for Lycidas, Lycidas anomalus was actually a Maratus, thus causing all then named Lycidas to be subsumed by Maratus. They hypothesize that the remaining genera may be related as shown below:

- Saitis sensu Zhang 2012
  - Jotus group
    - Jotus
    - Prostheclina
  - Saitis group
    - Saitis
    - Maratus group
      - Maratus
      - Hypoblemum

One molecular phylogenetic study, by Junxia Zhang in 2012, concluded that the seven Australian genera Hypoblemum, Jotus, Lycidas, Maileus, Maratus, Saitis, and Prostheclina were so closely related that they could all be accommodated in Saitis, but this suggestion has not been carried through to any taxonomic publication. In the Saitis group, the third leg is longer and the first leg unspecialized. In the Jotus group, the first leg is longer and specialized. In both Maratus and some Hypoblemum species in the Maratus group, the abdomen is raised during courtship, but only Maratus has a colorful dorsal plate.

=== Species ===
As of March 2026 it contains 118 species.

- Maratus albus Otto & Hill, 2016 – Western Australia, South Australia
- Maratus amabilis Karsch, 1878 (type species) – Australia
- Maratus ammophilus Otto & Hill, 2022 – Western Australia
- Maratus anomaliformis (Zabka, 1987) – Queensland
- Maratus anomalus (Karsch, 1878) – Queensland, New South Wales
- Maratus aquilus Schubert, 2019 – Western Australia
- Maratus astarte Otto & Hill, 2025
- Maratus aurantius Otto & Hill, 2017 – New South Wales
- Maratus australis Otto & Hill, 2016 – Western Australia
- Maratus avibus Otto & Hill, 2014 – Western Australia
- Maratus azureus Schubert, 2020 – Western Australia
- Maratus banyowla Otto & Hill, 2019 – Western Australia
- Maratus bitaeniatus (Keyserling, 1882) – Australia
- Maratus boranup Otto & Hill, 2018 – Western Australia
- Maratus bubo Otto & Hill, 2016 – Western Australia
- Maratus caeruleus Waldock, 2013 – Western Australia
- Maratus calcitrans Otto & Hill, 2012 – New South Wales, Australian Capital Territory, Victoria
- Maratus candens Otto & Hill, 2022 – Western Australia
- Maratus chlorophthalmus (Simon, 1909) – Western Australia
- Maratus chrysomelas (Simon, 1909) – Queensland, Western Australia, New South Wales, Victoria
- Maratus cinereus Otto & Hill, 2017 – Queensland
- Maratus clupeatus Otto & Hill, 2014 – Western Australia
- Maratus combustus Schubert, 2019 – Western Australia
- Maratus constellatus Schubert, 2020 – Western Australia
- Maratus cristatus Otto & Hill, 2017 – Western Australia
- Maratus cuspis Otto & Hill, 2019 – Western Australia
- Maratus digitatus Otto & Hill, 2012 – Queensland, New South Wales
- Maratus electricus Otto & Hill, 2017 – Western Australia
- Maratus elephans Otto & Hill, 2015 – New South Wales
- Maratus eliasi Baehr & Whyte, 2016 – Queensland
- Maratus expolitus Prasad, 2022 – Queensland, New South Wales, Victoria
- Maratus felinus Schubert, 2019 – Western Australia
- Maratus fimbriatus Otto & Hill, 2016 – New South Wales
- Maratus flavus Otto & Hill, 2018 – Western Australia
- Maratus fletcheri Waldock, 2020 – Western Australia
- Maratus gemmifer Otto & Hill, 2017 – Western Australia
- Maratus griseus (Keyserling, 1882) – Australia, New Zealand
- Maratus hakea (Otto & Hill, 2017) – Western Australia
- Maratus harrisi Otto & Hill, 2011 – Australian Capital Territory, Tasmania
- Maratus harveryi Waldock, 2020 – Western Australia
- Maratus hesperus (Otto & Hill, 2017) – Queensland, New South Wales, Victoria
- Maratus heteropogon (Simon, 1909) – Western Australia
- Maratus hortorum Waldock, 2014 – Western Australia
- Maratus icarus Otto & Hill, 2019 – Western Australia
- Maratus inaquosus Schubert, 2020 – Victoria
- Maratus jactatus Otto & Hill, 2015 – Queensland
- Maratus julianneae Baehr & Whyte, 2016 – Queensland
- Maratus karrie Waldock, 2013 – Western Australia
- Maratus kiwirrkurra Baehr & Whyte, 2016
- Maratus kochi (Zabka, 1987) – Australia
- Maratus kwenda Otto & Hill, 2025
- Maratus laurenae Schubert, 2020 – Western Australia
- Maratus lentus Otto & Hill, 2017 – New South Wales
- Maratus leo Otto & Hill, 2014 – South Australia
- Maratus linnaei Waldock, 2008 – Western Australia
- Maratus literatus Otto & Hill, 2014 – New South Wales
- Maratus lobatus Otto & Hill, 2016 – Western Australia, South Australia
- Maratus lynx Otto & Hill, 2024 – Western Australia
- Maratus madelineae Waldock, 2014 – Western Australia
- Maratus manjimup Otto & Hill, 2025
- Maratus marinus (Goyen, 1892)
- Maratus maritimus Otto & Hill, 2014 – Western Australia
- Maratus melindae Waldock, 2013 – Western Australia
- Maratus michaelorum Baehr & Whyte, 2016 – Queensland
- Maratus michaelseni (Simon, 1909) – Western Australia
- Maratus miles Otto & Hill, 2024 – Western Australia
- Maratus montanus Otto & Hill, 2014 – Western Australia
- Maratus mungaich Waldock, 1995 – Western Australia
- Maratus nambung Otto & Hill, 2023 – Western Australia
- Maratus nannup Otto & Hill, 2025
- Maratus nemo Schubert, 2021 – South Australia
- Maratus neptunus Otto & Hill, 2017 – New South Wales
- Maratus nigriceps (Keyserling, 1882) – Queensland
- Maratus nigromaculatus (Keyserling, 1883) – Queensland
- Maratus nimbus Otto & Hill, 2017 – Southern Australia
- Maratus noggerup Schubert, 2020 – Western Australia
- Maratus nubilis Otto & Hill, 2022 – Western Australia
- Maratus obscurior (Simon, 1909) – Western Australia
- Maratus occasus Schubert, 2019 – Queensland
- Maratus ottoi Baehr & Whyte, 2016 – Queensland
- Maratus pardus Otto & Hill, 2014 – Western Australia
- Maratus pavonis (Dunn, 1947) – Western Australia, New South Wales, Victoria, Tasmania
- Maratus personatus Otto & Hill, 2015 – Western Australia
- Maratus piliger (Keyserling, 1882) – Queensland
- Maratus pilosus (Keyserling, 1882) – Queensland
- Maratus pinniger Otto & Hill, 2022 – Western Australia
- Maratus playa Otto & Hill, 2023 – Western Australia, New South Wales, Victoria
- Maratus plumosus Otto & Hill, 2013 – Queensland, New South Wales, Victoria
- Maratus proszynskii Waldock, 2015 – Tasmania
- Maratus purcellae Otto & Hill, 2013 – New South Wales, Australian Capital Territory
- Maratus rainbowi Roewer, 1951 (replacement name, synonym Maratus splendens) – Western Australia, New South Wales, Victoria
- Maratus robinsoni Otto & Hill, 2012 – New South Wales
- Maratus sagittus Schubert & Whyte, 2019 – Queensland
- Maratus sapphirus Otto & Hill, 2017 – New South Wales
- Maratus sarahae Waldock, 2013 – Western Australia
- Maratus sceletus Otto & Hill, 2015 – Queensland
- Maratus scutulatus (L. Koch, 1881) – Australia. Introduced to New Zealand
- Maratus speciosus (O. Pickard-Cambridge, 1874) – Western Australia
- Maratus speculifer (Simon, 1909) – Western Australia
- Maratus spicatus Otto & Hill, 2012 – Western Australia
- Maratus suae Schubert, 2020 – Western Australia
- Maratus sylvestris Otto & Hill, 2019 – New South Wales
- Maratus tasmanicus Otto & Hill, 2013 – Western Australia, Tasmania
- Maratus tessellatus Otto & Hill, 2016 – Western Australia
- Maratus tiddalik Otto & Hill, 2020 – Western Australia
- Maratus tortus Otto & Hill, 2018 – Western Australia
- Maratus trigonus Otto & Hill, 2017 – Western Australia
- Maratus unicup Otto & Hill, 2018 – Western Australia
- Maratus velutinus Otto & Hill, 2012 – New South Wales
- Maratus vespa Otto & Hill, 2016 – Western Australia
- Maratus vespertilio (Simon, 1901) – Australia
- Maratus vittatus (Keyserling, 1881) – Queensland
- Maratus volans (O. Pickard-Cambridge, 1874) – Queensland, New South Wales, Victoria
- Maratus volpei Schubert, 2020 – South Australia
- Maratus vultus Otto & Hill, 2016 – Western Australia, Victoria
- Maratus watagansi Otto & Hill, 2013 – New South Wales
- Maratus yanchep Otto & Hill, 2023 – Western Australia

=== Nomenclature ===
Early scientific names mostly used Latin or Greek descriptors; for example, the type species Maratus amabilis (1878) refers to the friendly or pleasant Maratus. Maratus volans (1874) means the flying Maratus, reflecting the mistaken belief this species (and indeed the genus) could fly by means of its extended abdominal flap. They cannot fly and the flap is used in courtship or (in at least one case) ritualised combat. Maratus chrysomelas refers to the golden-yellow iridescence of the abdomen when viewed at some angles. In 1947, Dunn used the species name pavonis meaning peacock. Zabka and Waldock continued the tradition of using Latin and Greek in the 1980s and 1990s, as did Otto and Hill from 2011 on, also using a patronym for Stuart Harris in the case of Maratus harrisi. As peacock spiders became more popular, so did patronyms, with Maratus purcellae for its discoverer Otto and Hill 2013 and Maratus proszynski for Jerzy Prószyński Waldock 2015. Common names featured in news media gained traction, particularly with "sparklemuffin" for Maratus jactatus. In July 2016, Barbara Baehr and Robert Whyte from the Queensland Museum announced a newly discovered species to be named Maratus licunxin or Maratus licunxini after the artistic director of the Queensland Ballet, Li Cunxin and honoured Jürgen Otto with Maratus ottoi, Michael Duncan and Michael Doe with Maratus michaelorum, and Julianne Waldock with Maratus julianneae.

Maratus splendens and M. rainbowi refer to the same, single species, both listed here. Otto an Hill, when describing the female for the first time, chose to continue to use Rainbow's M. splendens rather than Roewer's replacement name M. rainbowi. While M. rainbowi still appears in a number of on-line catalogs, all published descriptions and studies of this spider to date have used the original name M. splendens, the replacement name never having gained currency and no longer is preoccupied.

In 2017, Otto and Hill published "A Catalogue of the Australian Peacock Spiders (Araneae: Salticidae: Euophryini: Maratus, Saratus)" in Peckhamia, having also recently erected a new genus for peacock spiders with significantly different genitalia to Maratus, being Saratus Otto & Hill, 2017.

In the catalogue, a single species of Saratus is listed, adult males are shown in photographs, range maps show areas that have been identified in prior publications, or by unpublished observations and posted photographs that the authors consider reliable.

== See also ==
- Sexual selection in spiders
