= Peckhamia =

Peckhamia may refer to:

- Peckhamia (spider), a genus of jumping spiders
- Peckhamia (journal), a scientific journal dedicated to research on jumping spiders
