= Peckhamia (journal) =

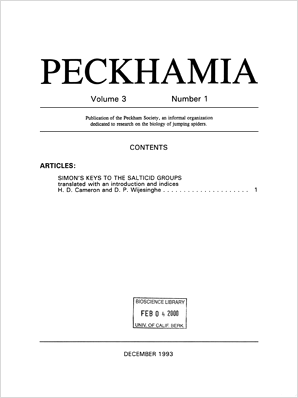
- Discipline: Arachnology
- Language: English
- Edited by: David E. Hill

Publication details
- History: 1977–present
- Publisher: Peckham Society
- Frequency: Irregular
- Open access: Yes

Standard abbreviations
- ISO 4: Peckhamia

Indexing
- ISSN: 2161-8526 (print); 1944-8120 (web)
- OCLC no.: 19834872

Links
- Journal homepage

Peckhamia is a peer-reviewed, open-access, scientific journal covering research on jumping spiders. It is published by the Peckham Society, an international organization of naturalists and scientists with an interest in jumping spiders, named in honor of George and Elizabeth Peckham. The journal was established in 1977 and its current editor-in-chief is David E. Hill.

Several species related to the peacock spider were first described in Peckhamia, including Maratus harrisi (2011), Saitis mutans (2012), Saitis virgatus (2012), Maratus robinsoni (2012), Maratus spicatus (2012), Maratus velutinus (2012), and Maratus avibus (2014). The genus Phanuelus was first described in Peckhamia in 2015.

Peckhamia is abstracted and indexed in The Zoological Record.
