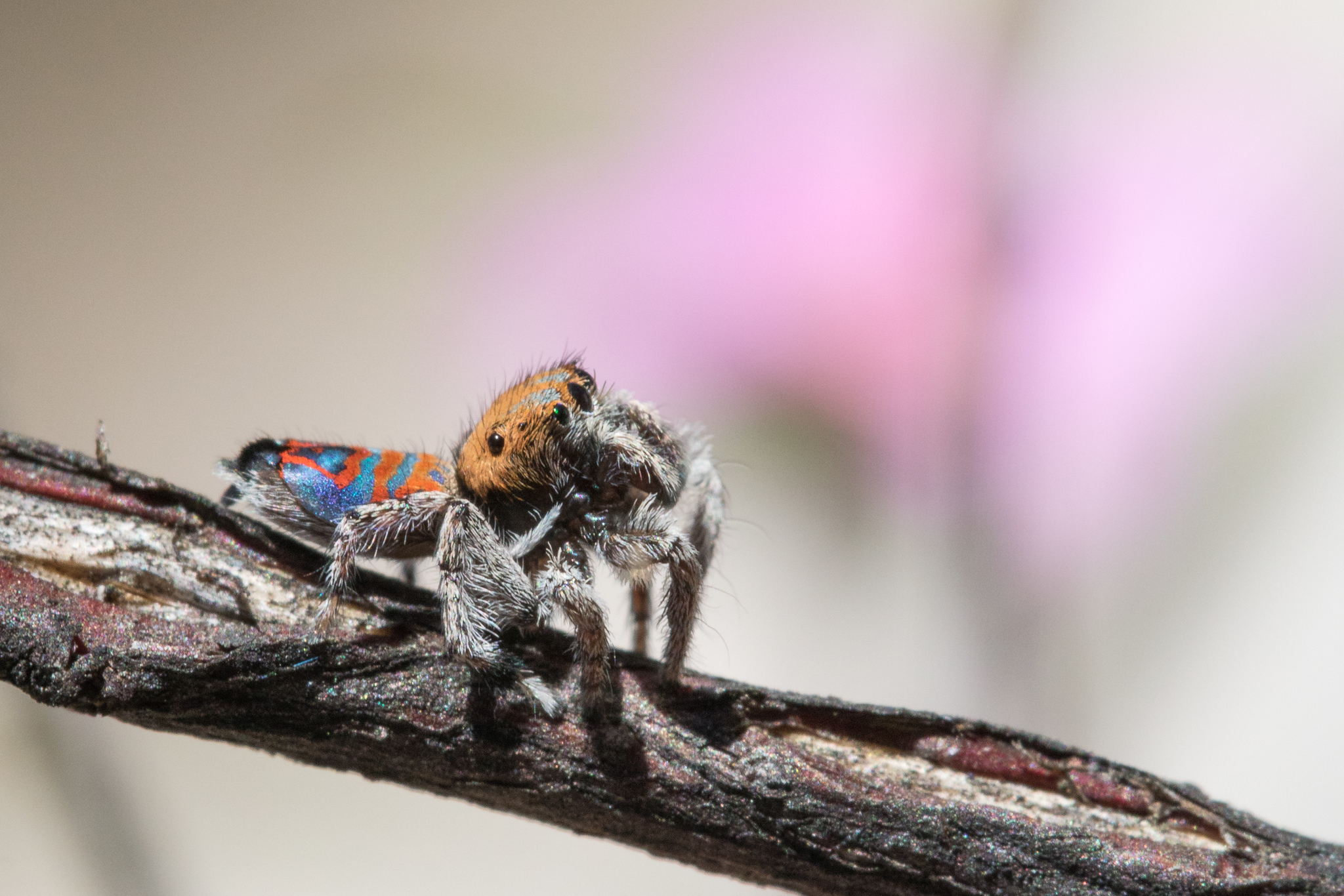
- A male sparklemuffin on a plant

Scientific classification
- Kingdom: Animalia
- Phylum: Arthropoda
- Subphylum: Chelicerata
- Class: Arachnida
- Order: Araneae
- Infraorder: Araneomorphae
- Family: Salticidae
- Genus: Maratus
- Species: M. jactatus

Binomial name
- Maratus jactatus Otto & Hill, 2015

= Maratus jactatus =

Species of spider

Maratus jactatus (colloquially named sparklemuffin) is a species of the genus Maratus (peacock spiders), an Australian member of the jumping spider family. Maratus jactatus is from the jumping spider group Salticidae. The name jactatus is Latin for rocking—derived from their signature mating rituals. Maratus jactatus have the ability to jump lengths up to 50 times their size. They have been collected only in Wondul Range National Park in southern Queensland. Sparklemuffins are very small spiders that range from 4 to 6 millimeters in length, similar to the length of a grain of rice. The males are close to 4.5 millimeters long, which is smaller compared to the females, who are about 5.3 millimeters long.

== Body structure and attributes ==
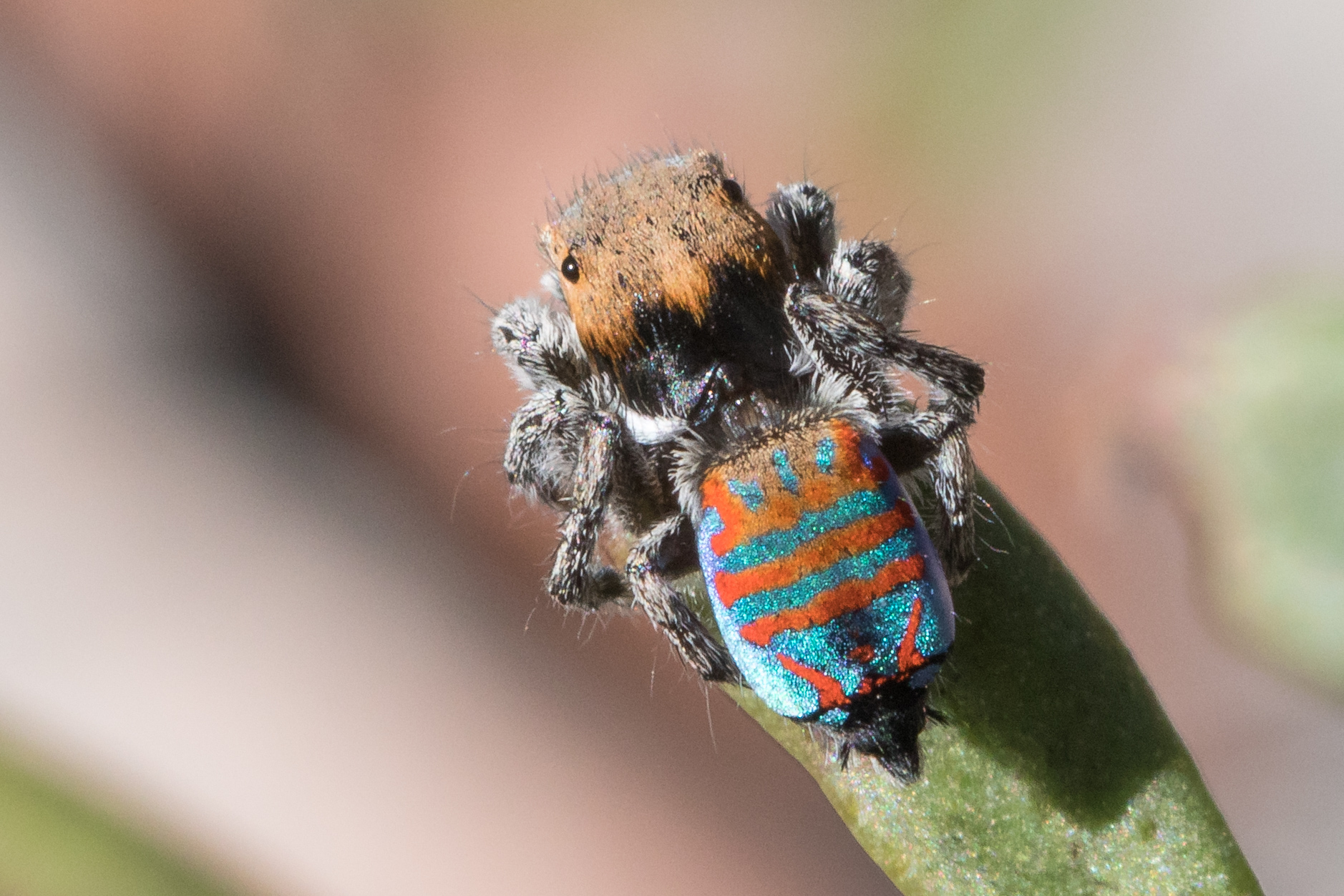
Male sparklemuffin from above

The female has a cryptically coloured back, whereas the male has a colourful back. Males have vibrant and unique colour patterns, similar to Maratus digitatus and Maratus calcitrans. Maratus jactatus males are set apart from these other species by their opisthosomal flap that extends to cover the opisthosomal plate. They also spread the flaps over their inflated opisthomal plate, revealing unique iridescent blue scales "interrupted by three bold transverse bands of red-orange to orange pigmented scales".

== Behaviour ==
=== Courtship ===
Like other Maratus spiders, the males of the species engage in a courtship display, during which they extend their median and posterior fringed spinnerets. A male presents both the extended spinnerets and his expanded and inflated opisthoma as he faces the female that he courts. Females will usually mate only once.

=== Maratus ===
==== Prey and predator relationships ====
Maratus spiders eat small insects like ants and sometimes other spiders. If a male is trying to court a female, and they are unimpressed, the female will sometimes eat the male. The spiders are preyed upon by bigger insects.

==== Role in ecosystem ====
They eat small insects, helping control insect populations.

==== Nesting ====
Females make their nest underground and stay to guard the eggs. The eggs hatch at different times depending on the sex of the spiderling.
