= Maratus sceletus =

Scientific classification
- Kingdom: Animalia
- Phylum: Arthropoda
- Subphylum: Chelicerata
- Class: Arachnida
- Order: Araneae
- Infraorder: Araneomorphae
- Family: Salticidae
- Genus: Maratus
- Species: M. sceletus

Binomial name
- Maratus sceletus Otto & Hill, 2015

Species of spider

Maratus sceletus (colloquially named skeletorus) is a species of the genus Maratus (peacock spiders), an Australian member of the jumping spider family. Described in 2015, they have been collected only in Wondul Range National Park in southern Queensland. The species name is derived from the Latin sceletus "skeleton", from its distinctive body pattern. Maratus sceletus is a small species, from 3.7 to 4.7 mm long. The male is black with prominent white stripes and markings across its carapace and legs.

Like other Maratus spiders, the males of the species engage in an elaborate courtship display. This involves the male raising his third legs and waving them around, flashing his underside, and sending vibrations to the female spider by shaking his body.
