= Maratus felinus =

Scientific classification
- Kingdom: Animalia
- Phylum: Arthropoda
- Subphylum: Chelicerata
- Class: Arachnida
- Order: Araneae
- Infraorder: Araneomorphae
- Family: Salticidae
- Genus: Maratus
- Species: M. felinus

Binomial name
- Maratus felinus Schubert, 2019

Species of peacock spider

Maratus felinus is a species of peacock spider native to Australia. It was discovered at Lake Jasper and Mount Romance along with two other species, Maratus aquilus and Maratus combustus.

== Description ==
Like other species of Maratus, males of the species are colourful and have a unique pattern. The species can be distinguished from other species by its atypical ovoid-shaped opisthosoma. According to researchers, the species is small and harmless.
