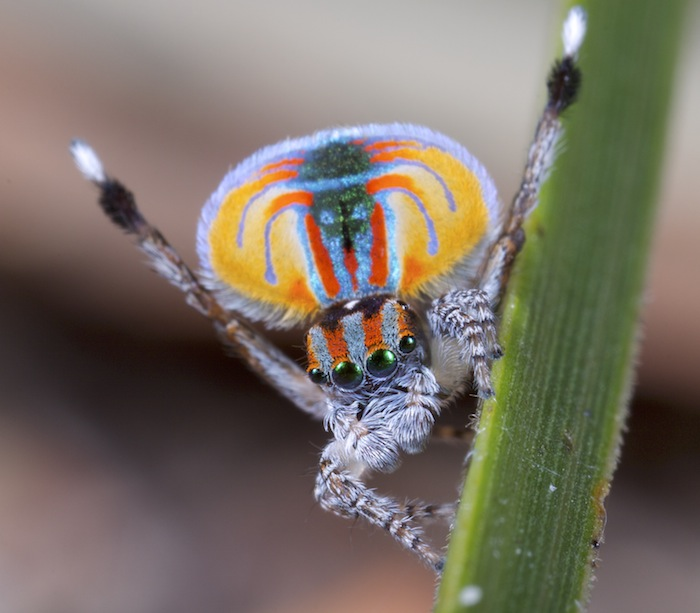
- Male
- Courtship rituals

Scientific classification
- Kingdom: Animalia
- Phylum: Arthropoda
- Subphylum: Chelicerata
- Class: Arachnida
- Order: Araneae
- Infraorder: Araneomorphae
- Family: Salticidae
- Genus: Maratus
- Species: M. volans

Binomial name
- Maratus volans (O. P-Cambridge, 1874)

Synonyms
- Salticus volans O. Pickard-Cambridge, 1874; Maratus amoenus Karsch, 1878; Saitis volans Simon, 1901

= Maratus volans =

Species of spider

A drawing of a male

Maratus volans is a species in the jumping spider family (Salticidae), belonging to the genus Maratus (peacock spiders). These spiders are native to certain areas in Australia and occupy a wide distribution of habitats. They have a specialized visual system that allows them to see the full visible spectrum as well as in the ultraviolet-range; this helps them detect and pursue prey. Males of this species are characterized by their colourful abdomen flaps, which are used to attract females during courtship.

== Description ==
Both sexes reach about 5 mm in body length. Females and immatures of both sexes are brown but have colour patterns by which they can be distinguished from related species.

== Behavior ==
=== Courtship ===
The red, blue and black males have flap-like extensions of the abdomen with white hairs that can be folded down. They are used for display during mating: the male raises his abdomen, then expands and raises the flaps so that the abdomen forms a white-fringed, circular field of colour. The species, and indeed the whole genus Maratus, have been compared to peacocks in this respect. The third pair of legs is also raised for display, showing a brush of black hairs and white tips. These legs are also used in a clapping motion to further attract a female's attention. While approaching the female, the male vibrates his abdomen while waving raised legs and tail, and dances from side to side. However, females are more attracted to the visual efforts of the dance done by the males rather than the vibrational signals. These visual efforts typically last around twenty-four minutes on average, but can range from six to fifty minutes.

=== Vibrations ===
An important part of the male peacock spider's courtship is the vibrations that accompany the fan dance. The exact mechanism of how these vibrations are produced is not known, but it is known that they are produced almost solely from rapid movements in their abdomen. There are three kinds of vibrations: rumble-rumps, crunch rolls, and grind-revs. Rumble-rumps are continuously emitted during the courtship, and can even start before the male sees the female. The name comes from the two distinct sounds, the rumble and the rump. The crunch rolls and grind-revs are observed right before the pre-mount display. Males who put forth more effort in both the visual display and the vibratory signaling had a higher success in mating. Having a higher measured effort meant putting in more time engaged in the visual display or vibrating with more vigor. Both of these are postulated to indicate a healthier and more fit male. However, visual displays are more strongly linked to mating success than vibratory signaling.

=== Female choice ===
For females who do choose to mate with the male, copulation time is also positively correlated to visual displays and vibratory signaling. Other aspects that are important include persistence, staying within proximity of the female and maintaining constant visual contact with her. If the female is interested she will occasionally respond to the approaching male by signaling with her third pair of legs. Her legs will be stretched out as they move, oftentimes one leg more engaged than the other. In M. volans, they found that the females are only likely to mate once.

=== Female aggression ===
If the male continues his dance when the female is not interested, she attempts to attack, kill, and feed on him; she may also do this after mating (sexual cannibalism). The male may escape by jumping. The behaviour of the female M. volans suggests why the males have developed unique sexual dimorphic features and courtship behaviour. If the female is already mated, then she will appear more aggressive, and less receptive to other males' displays. This can also occur if the female simply was not impressed by the male (fewer vibrations or less leg waving). She has an anti-receptivity signal that tells males she is not receptive. This serves a function to both the males and females. The males will stop wasting their energy on an unwilling female. The male's display is likely to attract predators, so stopping the performance is likely to protect both the female and male from potential dangers.

=== Copulation and pre-mount display ===
During the courtship display the male will slowly approach the female, as he lowers his carapace almost to the ground until they are about one body length apart. If the female does not flee then he will commence the pre-mount display. The pre-mount display is a highly conserved behaviour; the Maratus volans will follow a specific sequence: the third legs are rotated to the front over the first and second legs, while he retracts his colourful fan flaps. The third legs are lowered and spread apart as they tremor. The first legs will be held erect in front of the body almost touching the female. After this, the male will advance towards the female. Copulation can last a duration of several minutes to several hours. Throughout the whole courtship event, the male performs pedipalp flickers either alone or along with the other courtship displays. However, the pedipalp flicker may not be specific to courtship because it is also observed in other contexts like eating.

=== Pheromones ===
Contact pheromones, which are often released onto the silk drag-lines, can be detected by chemoreceptors on both the legs and palps. These pheromones, which are released by the abdomen of the female spider, can trigger male courtship even in the absence of visual cues. Pheromones given off by the female may be an indication of if they are already mated, and can hint to any other males whether or not to pursue courtship.

== Sexual selection ==
M. Volans use their colorful opisthosomal flaps to gain the attention of the female. Much of the mating ritual consists, however, of waving and vibrating the third legs for between four and fifty minutes. Jakob Bro-Jorgensen, an evolutionary ecologist, states that "When both sexes are allowed to respond optimally by introducing adaptive dynamics to a standard runaway model of condition dependent signaling, multiple signals can coexist even if the signal preferences entail significant costs". He explains that the potential sexual success outweighs the relatively low costs of the mating ritual. The mating behavior of M. volans is an example of runaway sexual selection where the male risks death when attempting to mate.

== Hunting and diet ==
Peacock spiders are diurnal cursorial hunters feeding primarily on insects and other spiders. The evolution of an acute visual system in salticids almost certainly originated as an adaptation for stalking prey. However, this development also facilitated a wandering lifestyle different from that of their sit-and-wait ancestors, enabling jumping spiders to roam and encounter many environments. Keen eyesight has probably been useful for peacock spiders in navigating, inhabiting and exploiting new types of habitats, and undoubtedly set the stage for the evolution of complex visual signals. Like other jumping spiders, they do not rely on webs to catch prey. They use their keen eyesight to stalk their prey and eventually chase and leap on their target to deliver a fatal bite. They have been observed to jump up to 40 times higher than their body length.

== Reproduction and lifecycle ==
=== Activity ===
M. volans are typically most active during the spring (Austral Spring), which is their breeding season. The mature males appear from August to December, while the females appear a bit later and survive longer. In December, the females will stay hidden in order to lay their eggs and guard them from predators.

=== Life cycle ===
Immature female peacock spiders resemble the adults, except their pedipalps are colourless. The immature male peacock spiders lack an opisthosomal fan, a prominent white marginal band of the carapace, as well as specialization of the third legs. The males do not generate their colours until sexual maturity. Their lifespan is reported to be about one year.

=== Eggs ===
In December, the females are observed to create nests underground where they will lay eggs. M. volans females have been observed to lay between 6 and 15 eggs per clutch. Some M. volans were observed to have several consecutive broods. Males hatch in August and can survive through December, while females hatch a bit later and tend to survive longer than males.

== Distribution and habitat ==
=== Distribution ===
M. volans is confined to specific parts of Australia (Queensland, New South Wales, Australian Capital Territory, Western Australia and Tasmania). They have a very wide distribution and occupy many different types of environments, unlike other species of Maratus that occupy only a niche habitat, like the M. Sarahae.

=== Habitat ===
The majority of Peacock spiders are ground dwelling and found on leaf litter or dry twigs. The females are thought to mimic leaf scars on the dry twigs; however, they can be found in a wide variety of habitats such as sand dunes to grasslands.

== Physiology ==
=== Eyesight ===
Peacock spiders each have eight eyes that are equipped with a telephoto lens, tiered retina, and ultraviolet-sensitive photoreceptor. They have reached the physical limit of optical resolution given their size. This special visual system allows them to see the full visible spectrum as well as in the ultraviolet-range. They have a set of primary eyes that provide acute vision and secondary eyes that aid them to detect motion. Their superb eyesight is useful in pursuing prey.

=== Scales ===
The male abdomen contains scales that produce its well known colorful display. Some male peacock spiders are able to change their scales from red to green to violet with slight movements, using their specialized abdominal scales that contain three dimensional reflective diffraction grating structures. They can reflect light in both the visible and the ultraviolet range.

== Name ==
The English arachnologist Octavius Pickard-Cambridge described the species. It was transferred to the genus Maratus by Marek Żabka in 1991, noting that "it is difficult to describe adequately the great beauty of the colouring of this spider".

The specific name volans means "flying" in Latin; O.P-Cambridge noted that the person who sent him the specimens from New South Wales had told him that he had seen the spiders "actually using [the flaps] as wings or supporters to sustain the length of their leaps." This belief has been debunked by the Australasian Arachnological Society.

== Sources ==
- Ed Nieuwenhuys: Peacock spider
- David Edwin Hill (2009): "Euophryine jumping spiders that extend their third legs during courtship (Araneaee: Salticidia: Euophryinae: Maratus, Saitis)". Peckhamia 74(1): 1-27. ISSN 1944-8120
- Jurgen C Otto and David E Hill (2011): "An illustrated review of the known peacock spiders of the genus Maratus from Australia, with description of a new species (Araneae: Salticidae: Euophryinae)." Peckhamia 96.1: 1-27. ISSN 1944-8120
- Thornhill, R., Alcock, J., (1984). The Evolution of Insect Mating Systems, Science Ne Series, 223(4638), 808-809
