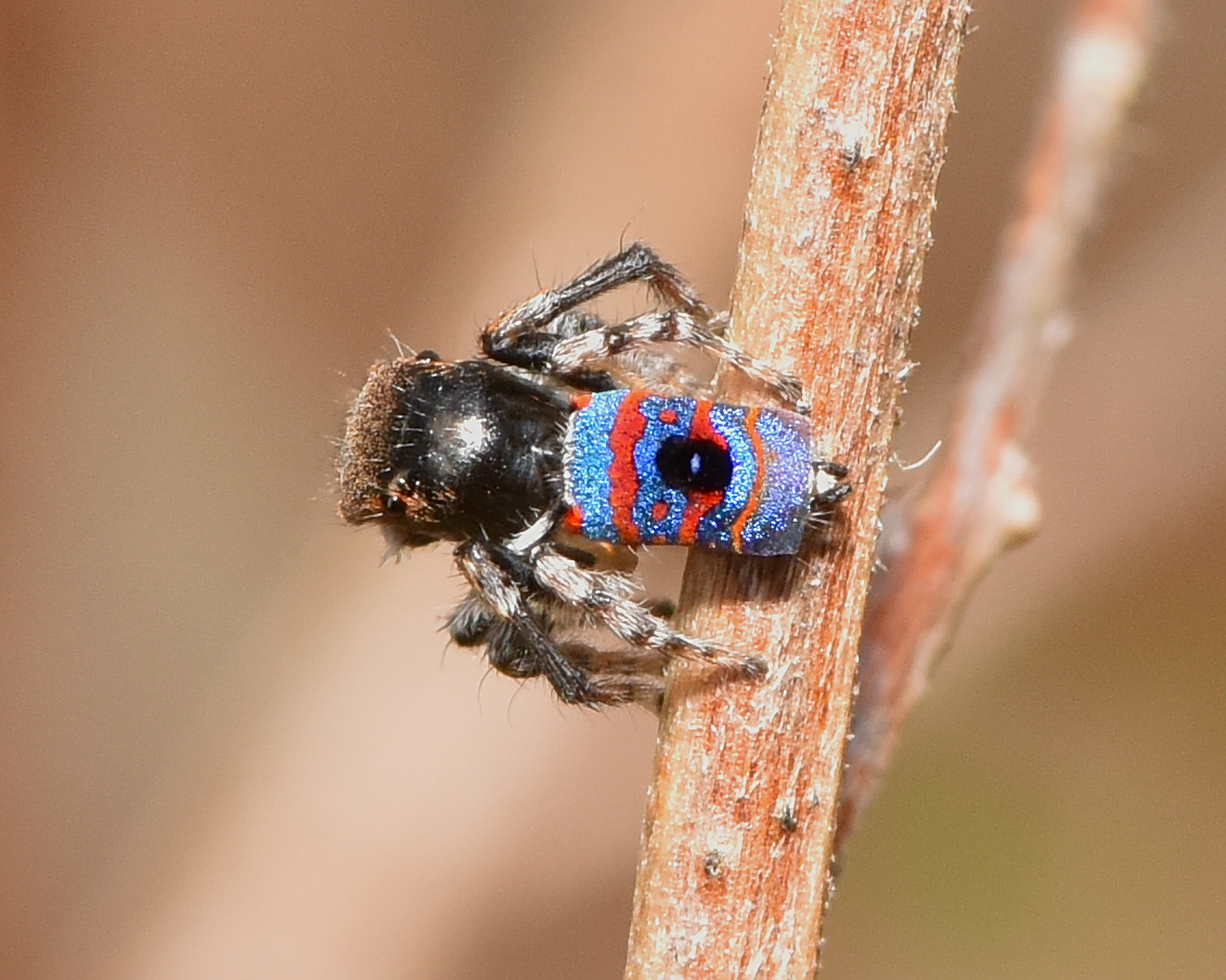

Scientific classification
- Kingdom: Animalia
- Phylum: Arthropoda
- Subphylum: Chelicerata
- Class: Arachnida
- Order: Araneae
- Infraorder: Araneomorphae
- Family: Salticidae
- Genus: Maratus
- Species: M. mungaich

Binomial name
- Maratus mungaich Waldock, 1995

= Maratus mungaich =

Species of spider

Maratus mungaich, the banksia peacock spider, is a species of jumping spider in the family Salticidae. It is endemic to Western Australia.

The species was first described in 1995 by Julianne Waldock. In 2013 she described a species-group for Maratus mungaich. In 2014 Waldock identified Maratus hortorum which had until then been identified as M.mungaich.

In courtship, males in the Maratus genus extend their elongated third legs, and only the male is so brightly and beautifully coloured.

== Etymology ==
The specific epithet, mungaich, derives from a Nyoongar word for "banksia" (mangatch).

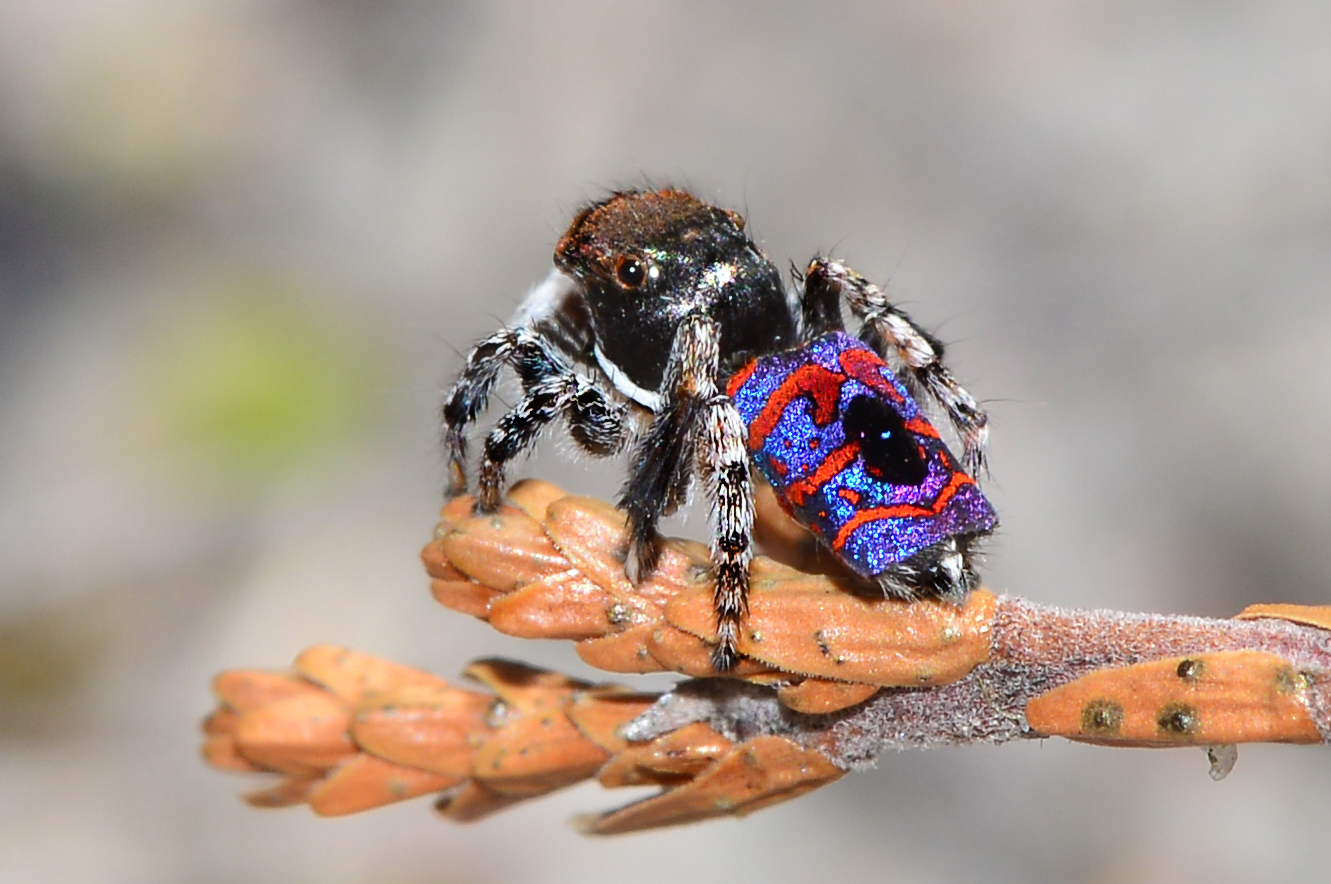
On a limb
