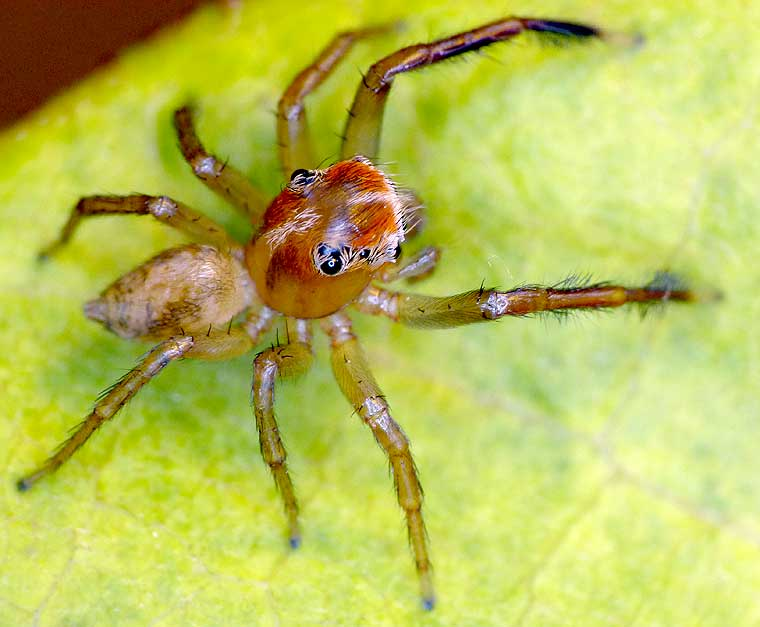

Scientific classification
- Kingdom: Animalia
- Phylum: Arthropoda
- Subphylum: Chelicerata
- Class: Arachnida
- Order: Araneae
- Infraorder: Araneomorphae
- Family: Salticidae
- Genus: Prostheclina
- Species: P. pallida

Binomial name
- Prostheclina pallida Keyserling, 1882

= Prostheclina pallida =

Species of spider

Prostheclina pallida is a species of spider in the family Salticidae, native to Eastern Australia. It was described by Keyserling in 1882, and remained the only species in the genus until 2007, when six more species were described.

== Description ==
Males have a body length of around 4.1 mm, females being somewhat longer at around 4.4 mm, with a longer abdomen in relation to the carapace. Both sexes have a yellow cephalothorax, which has stronger orange markings in males. The upper (dorsal) surface of the abdomen is pale yellow with a black pattern. The lower surface of both the cephalothorax and abdomen is yellow. The legs and pedipalps are yellow, except for parts of the first leg, which are orange. The palpal bulb of the male has a simpler set of lobes on the tegulum than other species of Prostheclina.

== Taxonomy ==
Prostheclina pallida was first described by Eugen von Keyserling in 1882; it was the type species for his new genus Prostheclina. Considered to be the only species in the genus from 1950 onwards, six more were added in 2007.

== Distribution and habitat ==
Prostheclina pallida is an Australian species, known from southern Queensland, inland Victoria and South Australia, where they are found at lower altitudes on both sides of the Great Dividing Range. The genus is only found in less dry areas, typically where the rainfall exceeds 600 mm a year.
