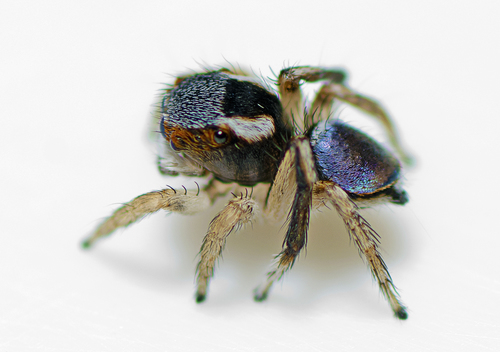

Scientific classification
- Kingdom: Animalia
- Phylum: Arthropoda
- Subphylum: Chelicerata
- Class: Arachnida
- Order: Araneae
- Infraorder: Araneomorphae
- Family: Salticidae
- Genus: Maratus
- Species: M. anomalus

Binomial name
- Maratus anomalus (Karsch, 1878)

Synonyms
- Lycidas anomalus Karsch, 1878

= Maratus anomalus =

Species of jumping spider

Maratus anomalus or the unusual peacock spider, is a species of peacock spider in the family Salticidae. M. anomalus was described by Karsch in 1878 in Queensland Australia and New South Wales.

== Description and behaviour ==
The abdomen of Maratus anomalus is shiny and colourful with the colour changing depending on the side someone views it on. Colours include turquoise and purple. Males often show off this colour. The spider lacks a extendable flap.
