= Maratus vespa =

Scientific classification
- Kingdom: Animalia
- Phylum: Arthropoda
- Subphylum: Chelicerata
- Class: Arachnida
- Order: Araneae
- Infraorder: Araneomorphae
- Family: Salticidae
- Genus: Maratus
- Species: M. vespa

Binomial name
- Maratus vespa Otto & Hill, 2016

Species of spider

Maratus vespa is a species of the peacock spider genus, Maratus, characterised by its distinctive courtship display. The male spiders are characterized by a bright abdomen, lateral flaps, and an elongated third pair of legs. When attempting to attract a mate, the male spider will raise its colourful abdomen and elongated third pair of legs and wave them, along with extending its lateral flaps. This complex display of courtship is analogous to that of a peacock, hence the common name of this spider species.
