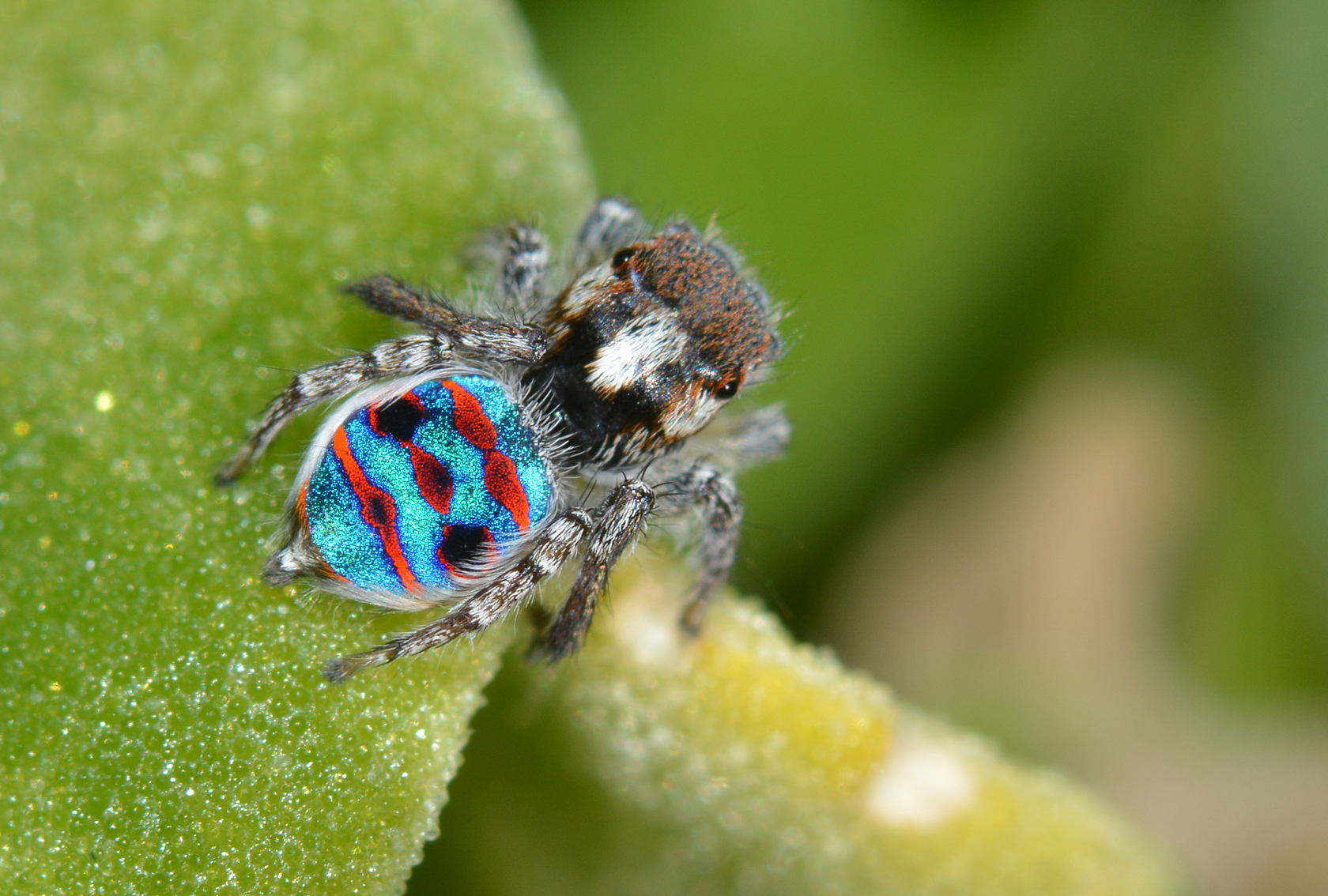

Scientific classification
- Kingdom: Animalia
- Phylum: Arthropoda
- Subphylum: Chelicerata
- Class: Arachnida
- Order: Araneae
- Infraorder: Araneomorphae
- Family: Salticidae
- Genus: Maratus
- Species: M. speciosus

Binomial name
- Maratus speciosus (O. P-Cambridge, 1874)

Synonyms
- Salticus speciosus O. Pickard-Cambridge, 1874; Habrocestum speciosum Keyserling, 1883; Saitis speciosus Simon, 1901

= Maratus speciosus =

Species of spider

Maratus speciosus, sometimes called the coastal peacock spider, is an Australian species of jumping spider (family Salticidae). They are only known to inhabit the vegetation of the coastal sand dunes of southwestern Western Australia. Like other Maratus spiders, the males of the species engage in a courtship display during which they raise their third pair of legs and their abdomen, presenting their colourful opisthosomal plate to potential female partners. Accompanying their elaborate dance moves, males beat their front and back body halves together, sending vibrations that travel through the ground which the females pick up, stimulating them into receiving higher chances of a successful mate. Unlike other Maratus, however, the males of this species have a set of bright orange hairs (setae) along both edges of the opisthosoma which only become visible during this display. Maratus speciosus derives from the arachnid class with both sexes measuring about 5 mm in body length, equivalent to a pencil eraser. This organism is known as diurnal cursorial hunters, meaning they feed on insects. Like any other jumping spider, they rely on their keen vision and jumping actions to help them travel and spot prey at far distances.

== Gallery ==
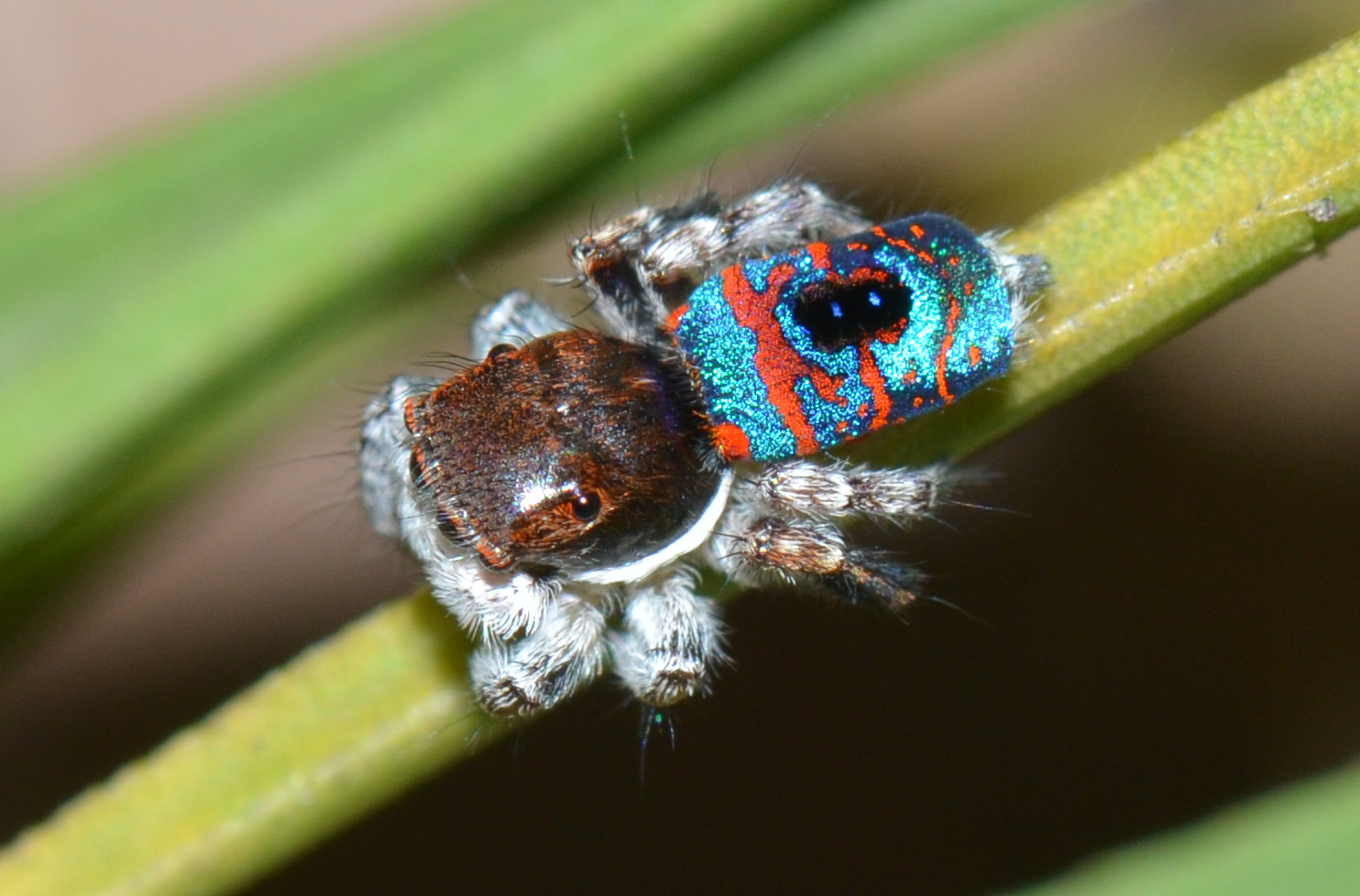
Maratus mungaich. Notice the different way of closing fan.

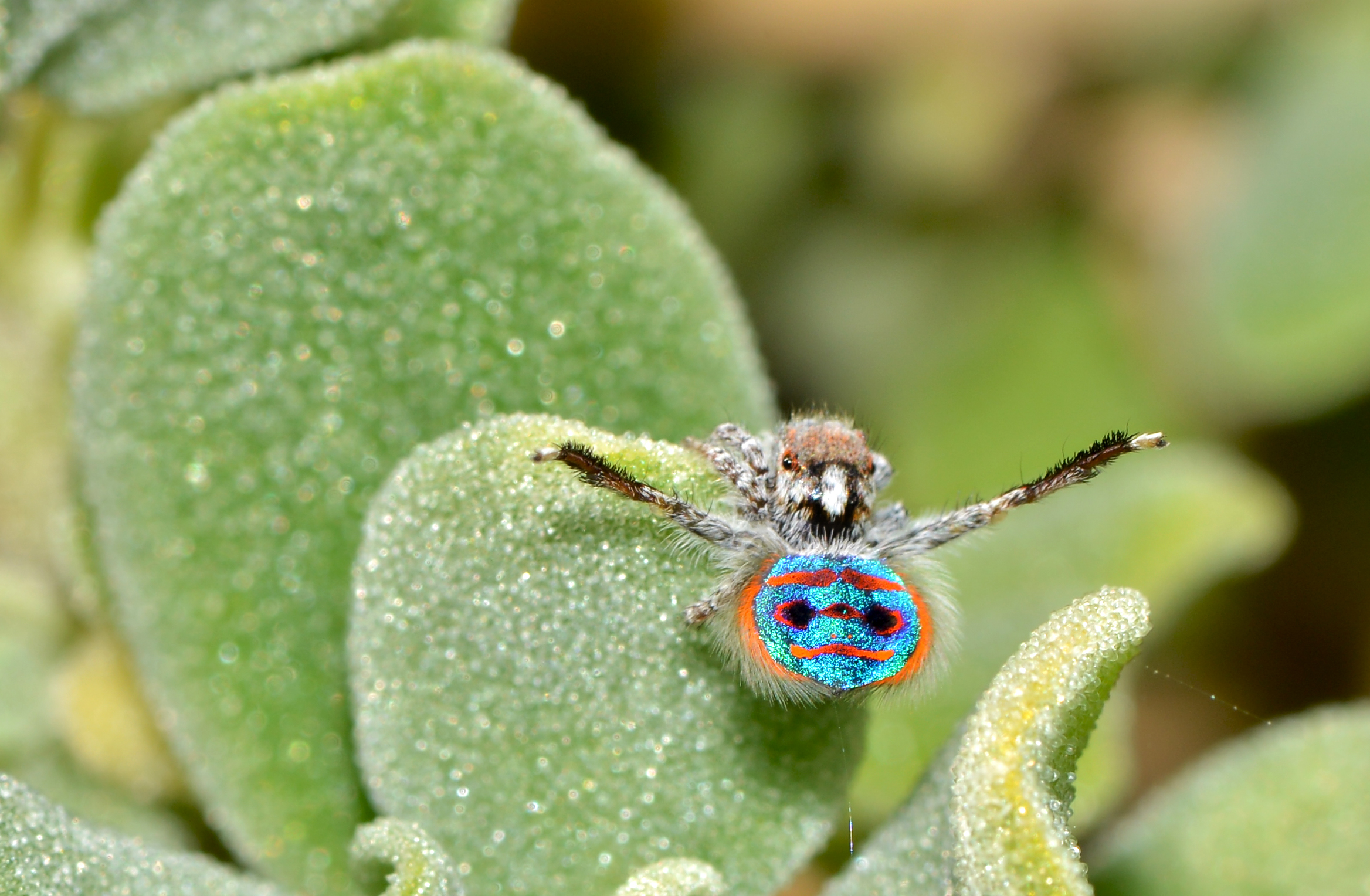
Displaying orange setae
