= Maratus sapphirus =

Scientific classification
- Kingdom: Animalia
- Phylum: Arthropoda
- Subphylum: Chelicerata
- Class: Arachnida
- Order: Araneae
- Infraorder: Araneomorphae
- Family: Salticidae
- Genus: Maratus
- Species: M. sapphirus

Binomial name
- Maratus sapphirus Otto & Hill, 2017

Species of spider

Maratus sapphirus is a species of peacock spider. The spider is endemic to the south coast of New South Wales, Australia. It was first described in 2017 after a specimen was found at the Murrah Flora Reserve.
