= Maratus hesperus =

Scientific classification
- Kingdom: Animalia
- Phylum: Arthropoda
- Subphylum: Chelicerata
- Class: Arachnida
- Order: Araneae
- Infraorder: Araneomorphae
- Family: Salticidae
- Genus: Maratus
- Species: M. hesperus

Binomial name
- Maratus hesperus (Otto & Hill, 2017)

Synonyms
- Saratus hesperus Otto & Hill, 2017

Genus of spiders

Maratus hesperus is a species of Australian jumping spiders. It was first described by J. C. Otto & D. E. Hill in 2017, and has only been found in Australia.
