= Maratus unicup =

Scientific classification
- Kingdom: Animalia
- Phylum: Arthropoda
- Subphylum: Chelicerata
- Class: Arachnida
- Order: Araneae
- Infraorder: Araneomorphae
- Family: Salticidae
- Genus: Maratus
- Species: M. unicup

Binomial name
- Maratus unicup Otto, 2018

Species of spider

Maratus unicup is a species of jumping spider of the genus Maratus.

The species was identified in 2018 while biologist Jurgen Otto and associate David Hill were looking for the peacock spider species Maratus tortus in southern Western Australia in 2017.
