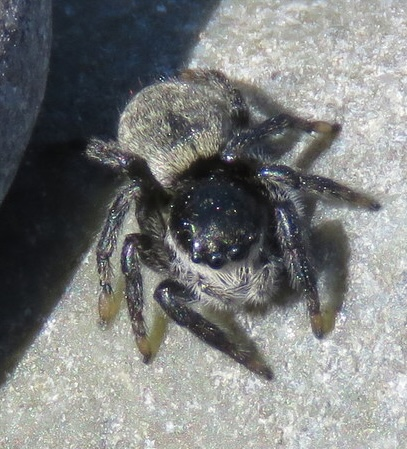

Conservation status
- Naturally Uncommon (NZ TCS)

Scientific classification
- Kingdom: Animalia
- Phylum: Arthropoda
- Subphylum: Chelicerata
- Class: Arachnida
- Order: Araneae
- Infraorder: Araneomorphae
- Family: Salticidae
- Genus: Maratus
- Species: M. marinus

Binomial name
- Maratus marinus Goyen, 1892
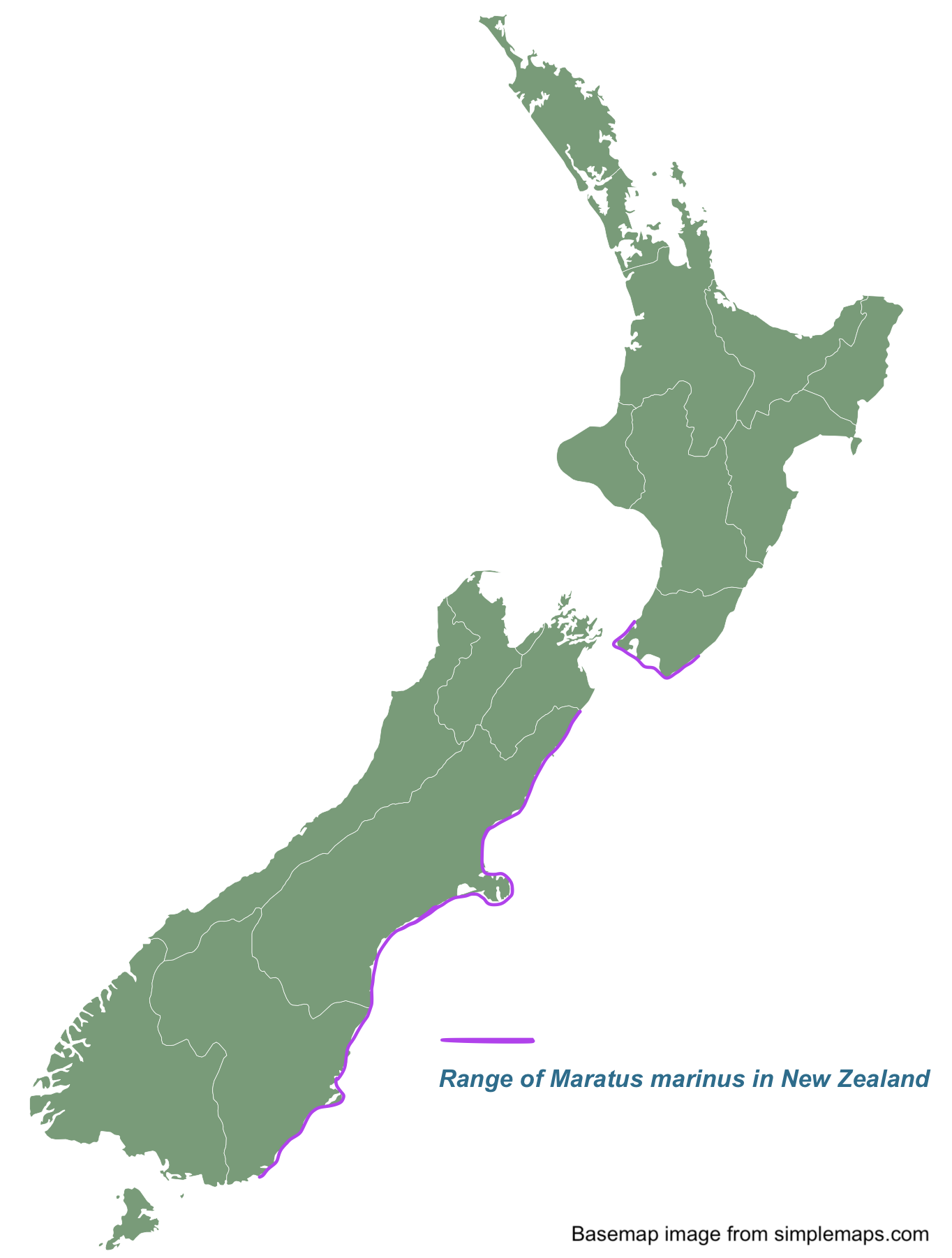
- Distribution of the seashore jumper

Synonyms
- Marptusa marina Goyen 1892; Marpissa marina Roewer, 1955

= Maratus marinus =

Species of jumping spider

Maratus marinus, known casually as the seashore jumper, is a New Zealand endemic coastal jumping spider, of the peacock spider genus Maratus.

== Taxonomy ==
Maratus marinus was first described by Peter Goyen in 1892 from a female specimen found along coastal Otago, as Marptusa marina, likely based on the fly-mimicry behavior he observed. However, his diagnosis was derived from amateur taxonomic knowledge. Doubt about the classification later led the spider to be classified as Marpissa marina under the Northern-hemisphere only genus Marpissa, based on matching generic features, and scope for pending taxonomic work was acknowledged. A 2024 redescription of the species using DNA analysis, has confirmed the spider's phylogeny, reclassifying it as Maratus marinus.

== Description ==
The base body and legs of M.marinus are black in colour, shielded by grey setae, giving the spider a salt-and-pepper haired appearance. In general, their opisthosoma/abdomen appears grey with a black cephalothorax and legs, with their pedipalps densely covered in grey or black setae. The spider is relatively large for its genus, measuring 4.8 mm to 8.8 mm in length, whereas genus Maratus of peacock spiders are typically 2–6 mm. Their eye arrangement matches that of jumping spiders, with the large primary pair anterior of the cephalothorax, like a pair of goggles. Males and females are not especially different in morphology; although some dimorphic features include: the obovate-rectangular abdomen of males versus the obovate abdomen of females, the frontmost leg pair of males being the longest versus the hindmost leg pair of females being the longest, and the clypeus being covered in long black/dark grey setae in males versus in a dense band of white/grey setae in females.

== Distribution and habitat ==
Maratus marinus is endemic to New Zealand. It is found across the eastern coast of the South Island, including Banks Peninsula and Kaikoura, and in the southernmost coastline of the North Island.The spider resides in shingle and boulder beaches, around the high-tide zone, and is often exposed to the wave influx of the intertidal zone. It can be spotted among the seaside gravel and rock; however, its grayscale allows it to camouflage with its rocky environment making it hard to be noticed.

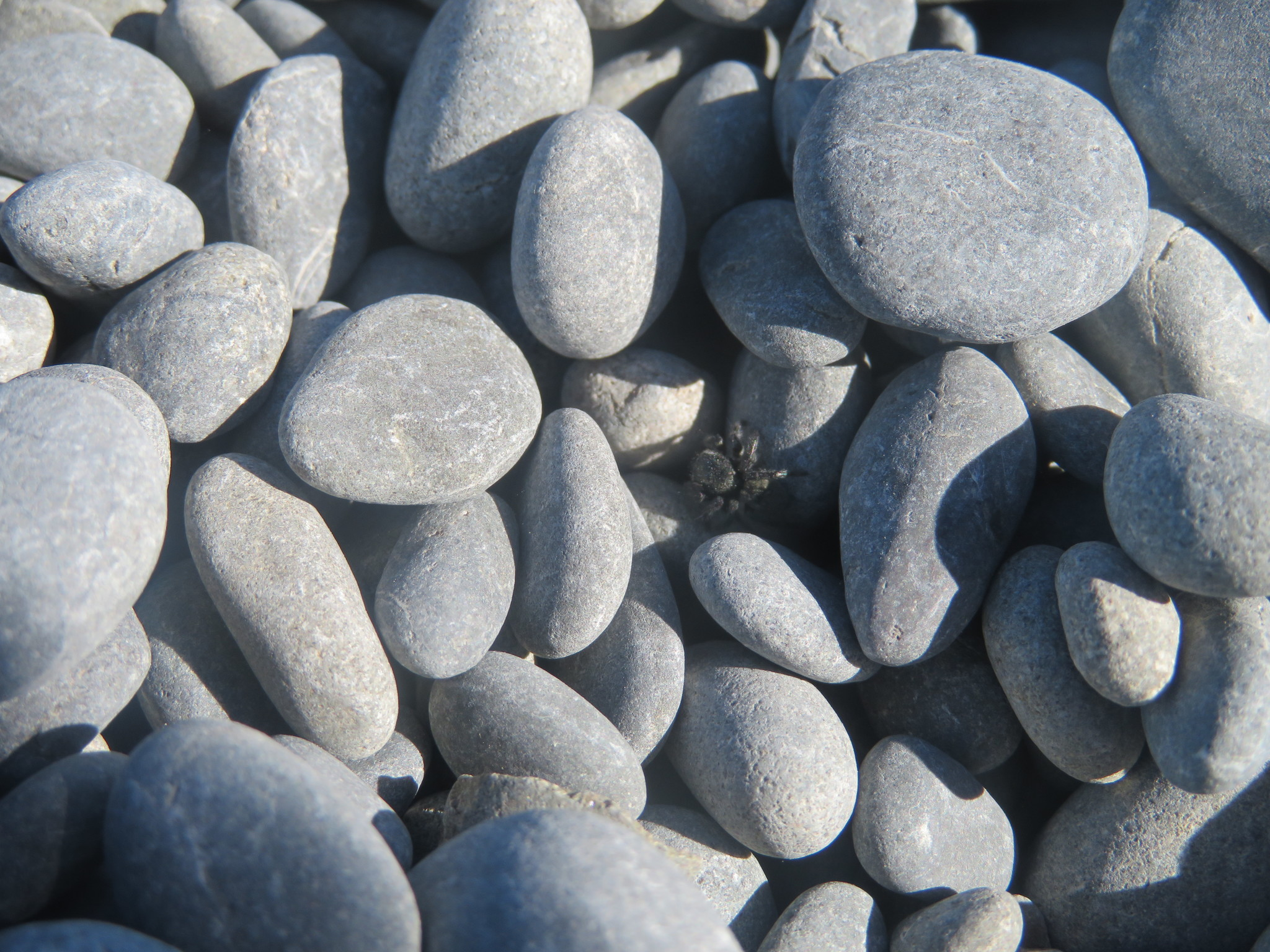
A relatively cryptic seashore jumper among greywacke shingles.

== Biology ==
Maratus marinus is most likely to be seen between September and April, the warmer months of New Zealand. Salticids prefer and are drawn out by sunlight and warmth, lacking which they retreat into their nests.

The spider builds cigar-shaped nests for retreat in well-shaded pebble undersides, rock crevices or in shells. Building nests in shells allows them to have an air pocket in the case of tidal influx, a handy adaptation for a marine salticid. Their nests measure the spider's body length in width, and 2–3 times the same in length.

The circadian routine of movement in Maratus marinus is dependent upon photoreceptors in its three secondary eye pairs, a biological process which probably extends to the salticid family. Like most jumping spiders, Maratus marinus is also a 'hopper', although it does exercise stealthy locomotion when pursuing prey.

== Behaviour ==
=== Display and communication ===
In looks, Maratus marinus is atypical to the vibrant peacock spiders of its genus. However, display behaviors of communication and courting can justify its classification if it is needed. A diverse repertoire of display interactions is performed by the seashore jumper intraspecifically, with around 21 displays overall. Among the display elements are two abdomen twitching motions: raising the abdomen up and down, and rotating the raised abdomen. These are noticed in male to female interactions incorporated in a zigzagging dance approach when away from a nest, or as stationary displays at a female's nest. The twitch abdomen is also noticed in male-male interactions specifically at nest sites, between a resident and an intruder spider. The most intricate display of male-male dominance or aggression is quadrupedal posturing when away from nest sites, involving a raised cephalothorax, tilted-up abdomen, and leg pairs 1 and 3 held erect. Several other displays are carried out by Maratus marinus, sorted across same-sex and opposite-sex interactions and depending on proximity to a nest.

Apart from using visual identification, it has not been conclusively found that male Maratus marinus can identify a conspecific female by odor (airborne pheromones) alone. It can engage in competitive male-male interactions to a certain extent, when initially sensing heterospecific pheromones. More effective pheromonal communication occurs in Maratus marinus via pheromones immersed in silk. These contact pheromones are emitted by females in webbing, allowing the pheromones to persist longer. Receiving spiders do so by using chemosensitive chelicerates and may be able to detect specific information about the emitting female, like aggressive or cannibalistic tendencies.

=== Cannibalism ===
Cannibalism has been observed in the species away from nest sites and occurs at higher percentages in female-female interactions, followed by female-male cannibalism. Cannibalism occurs at relatively lower percentages in male-female interactions (where males kill and eat females), and male-male interactions.

=== Diet and hunting behaviour ===
Unlike most spiders that catch prey in their webbing, salticids are diurnal spiders that are visually advanced to hunt prey. Maratus marinus is capable of catching and devouring prey larger than itself, and hunts insects like flies and moths of its environment. However, it stalks moths that are cryptic against a matching background less than moths against a background contrasting them, most likely because it cannot easily perceive the moth prey. The original observations of Goyen in 1892 note the running and pausing movement towards prey, with rubbing of the pedipalps together.

More recent studies have explored the detouring behavior of salticids like Maratus marinus to approach prey subtly before pouncing. The studies found that detours are initiated regardless of whether prey shows movement or not, and that the spider regularly detours and re-orients itself until it is in a position to attack the prey.

== Predators ==
Goyen described the pursuit of Maratus marinus by another spider, where M. marinus ran and leapt with its prey and resorted to jumping off a rock and hanging from a single web strand to escape.
