= Maratus proszynskii =

Scientific classification
- Kingdom: Animalia
- Phylum: Arthropoda
- Subphylum: Chelicerata
- Class: Arachnida
- Order: Araneae
- Infraorder: Araneomorphae
- Family: Salticidae
- Genus: Maratus
- Species: M. proszynskii

Binomial name
- Maratus proszynskii Waldock, 2015

Species of spider

Maratus proszynskii is a species of the genus Maratus (peacock spiders), first found in Tasmania.
