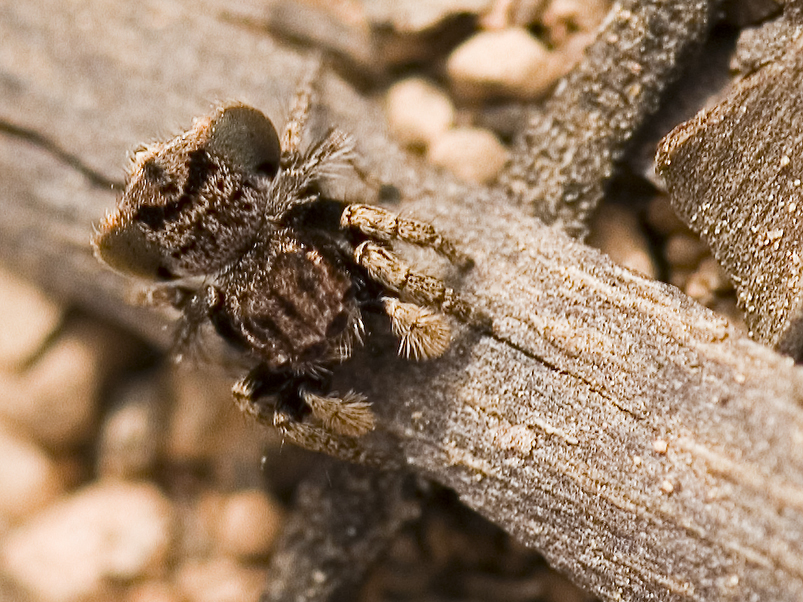
- male

Scientific classification
- Kingdom: Animalia
- Phylum: Arthropoda
- Subphylum: Chelicerata
- Class: Arachnida
- Order: Araneae
- Infraorder: Araneomorphae
- Family: Salticidae
- Genus: Maratus
- Species: M. vespertilio

Binomial name
- Maratus vespertilio (Simon, 1901)

Synonyms
- Saitis vespertilio Simon, 1901

= Maratus vespertilio =

Species of spider

Maratus vespertilio is a species of the genus Maratus (peacock spiders), an Australian member of the jumping spider family. Males expand their colourful abdominal flaps for display during courtship as well as in contests with other males.
