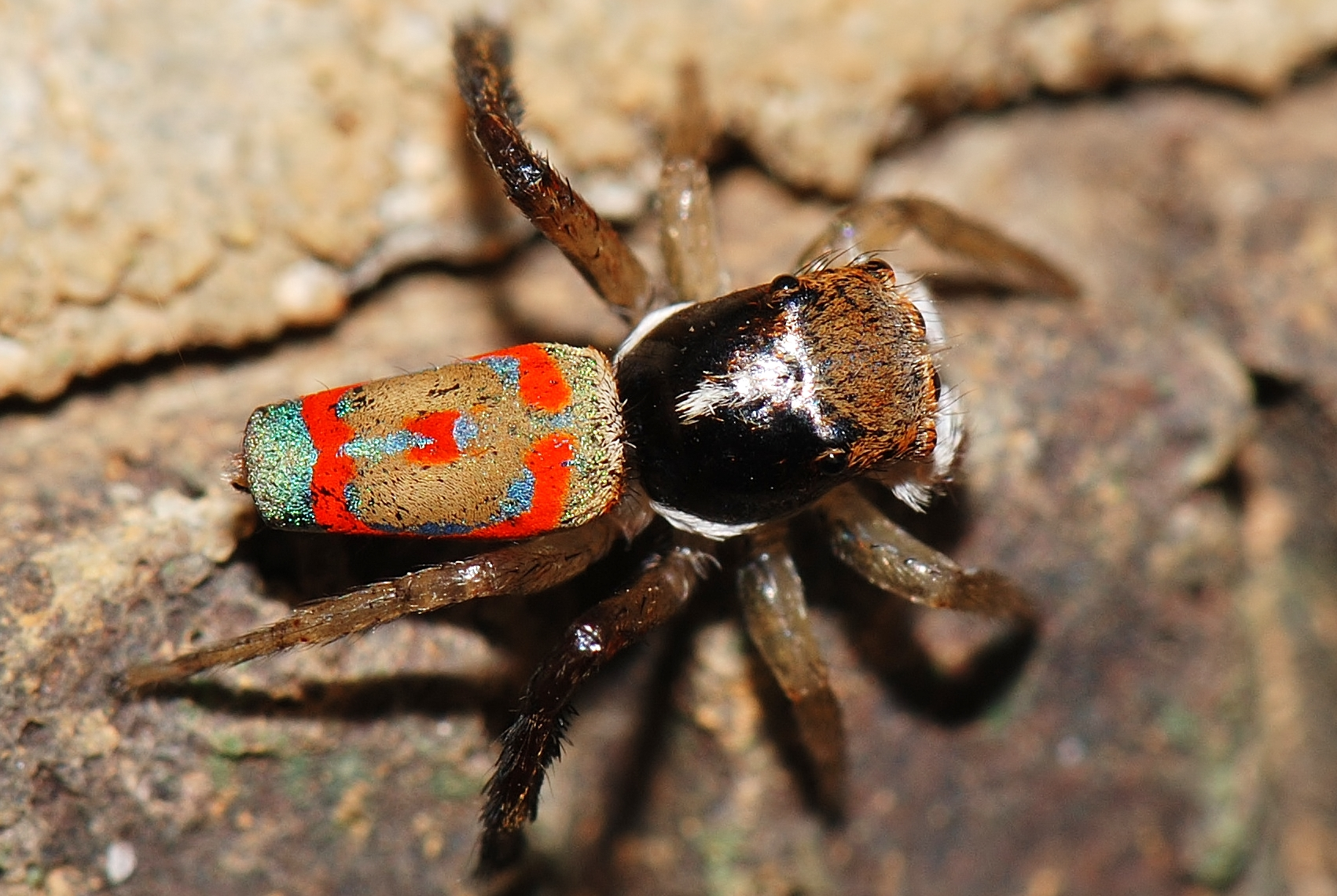
- Male

Scientific classification
- Kingdom: Animalia
- Phylum: Arthropoda
- Subphylum: Chelicerata
- Class: Arachnida
- Order: Araneae
- Infraorder: Araneomorphae
- Family: Salticidae
- Genus: Maratus
- Species: M. pavonis

Binomial name
- Maratus pavonis Dunn, 1947

Synonyms
- Saitis pavonis Dunn, 1947; Maratus pavonis nornalup Baehr & Whyte, 2016

= Maratus pavonis =

Species of spider

Maratus pavonis is a species of jumping spider (Salticidae), endemic to Australia, where it is found in Western Australia, New South Wales, Victoria and Tasmania. The species epithet, pavonis, derives from the Latin, pavo, pavonis, meaning "peacock".

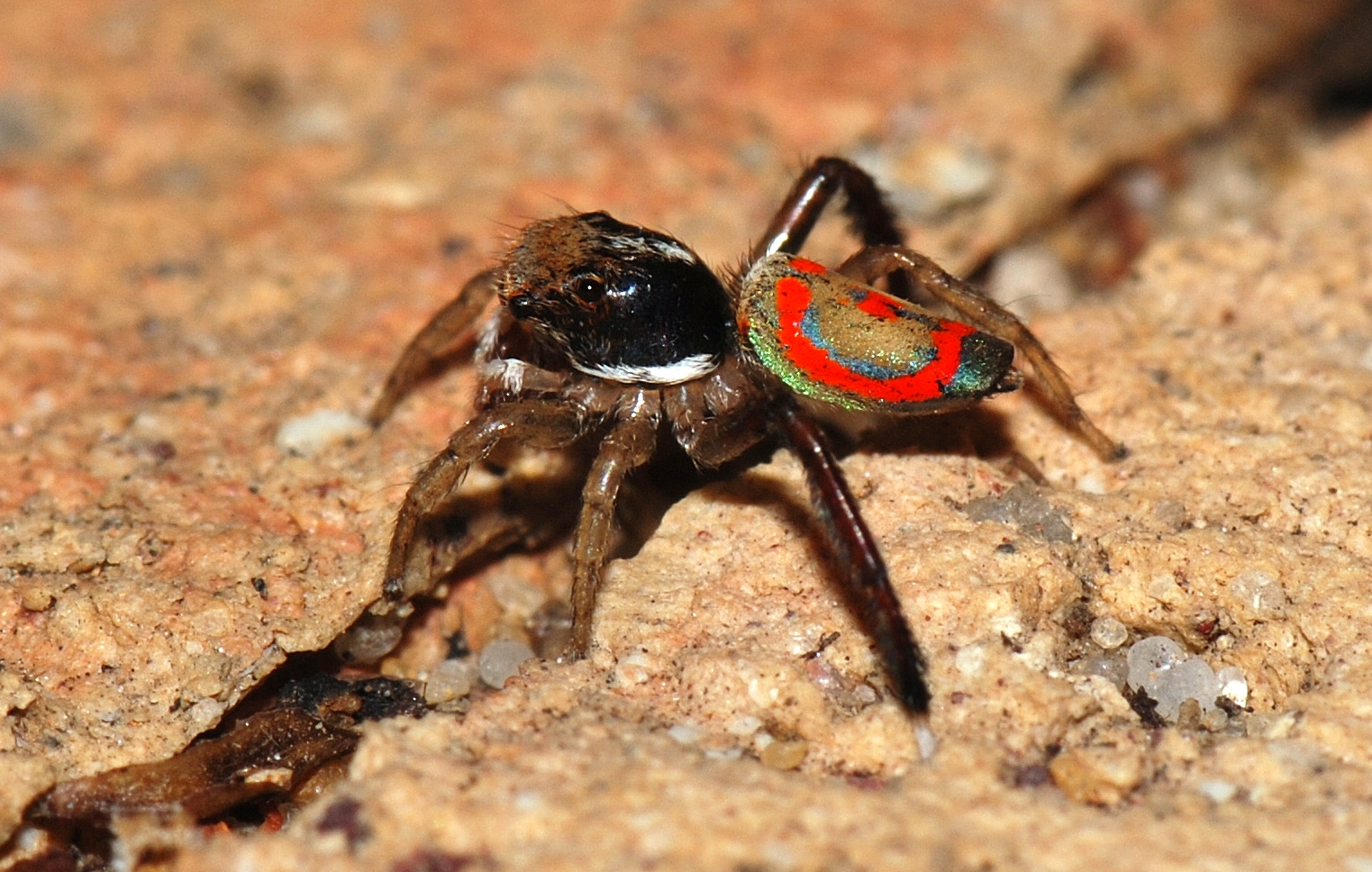
Male

The male holotype is tiny, measuring just 4.34 millimetres (0.171 in). In courtship, males in the Maratus genus extend their elongated third legs, and only the male is so brightly and beautifully coloured.

For its likeness and differences from Maratus splendens, see Otto & Hill (2011).
