= Maileus =

Scientific classification
- Kingdom: Animalia
- Phylum: Arthropoda
- Subphylum: Chelicerata
- Class: Arachnida
- Order: Araneae
- Infraorder: Araneomorphae
- Family: Salticidae
- Genus: Maileus; Peckham & Peckham, 1907
- Species: M. fuscus

Binomial name
- Maileus fuscus Peckham & Peckham, 1907

Genus of spiders

Maileus is a monotypic genus of jumping spiders containing the single species, Maileus fuscus. It was first described by G. Peckham & Elizabeth Peckham in 1907, and is only found on Borneo. It is closely related to the genus Microhasarius.

M. fuscus is known only from a single female, which is about 6 millimetres (0.24 in) long. Although no published drawings exist, Zabka has drawn the genitalia, and Proszynski has drawn the genitalia of both sexes of what is probably a different species of Maileus. No study has been published on the genus since its first description.

== Name ==
The species name is derived from Latin fuscus "dusky, brown".
