= Maratus aquilus =

Scientific classification
- Kingdom: Animalia
- Phylum: Arthropoda
- Subphylum: Chelicerata
- Class: Arachnida
- Order: Araneae
- Infraorder: Araneomorphae
- Family: Salticidae
- Genus: Maratus
- Species: M. aquilus

Binomial name
- Maratus aquilus Schubert, 2019

Species of spider

Maratus aquilus is a species of the peacock spider genus, discovered in 2019 by Australian scientist Joseph Schubert.

The discovery of the three spiders (Maratus aquilus, Maratus combustus and Maratus felinus) were made in Lake Jasper and Mount Romance in Western Australia.
