= Maratus lobatus =

Scientific classification
- Kingdom: Animalia
- Phylum: Arthropoda
- Subphylum: Chelicerata
- Class: Arachnida
- Order: Araneae
- Infraorder: Araneomorphae
- Family: Salticidae
- Genus: Maratus
- Species: M. lobatus

Binomial name
- Maratus lobatus Otto & Hill, 2016

Species of spider

Maratus lobatus is a species of the peacock spider genus, characterised by its distinctive courtship display. They are found on the south coast of Western Australia and in South Australia.
