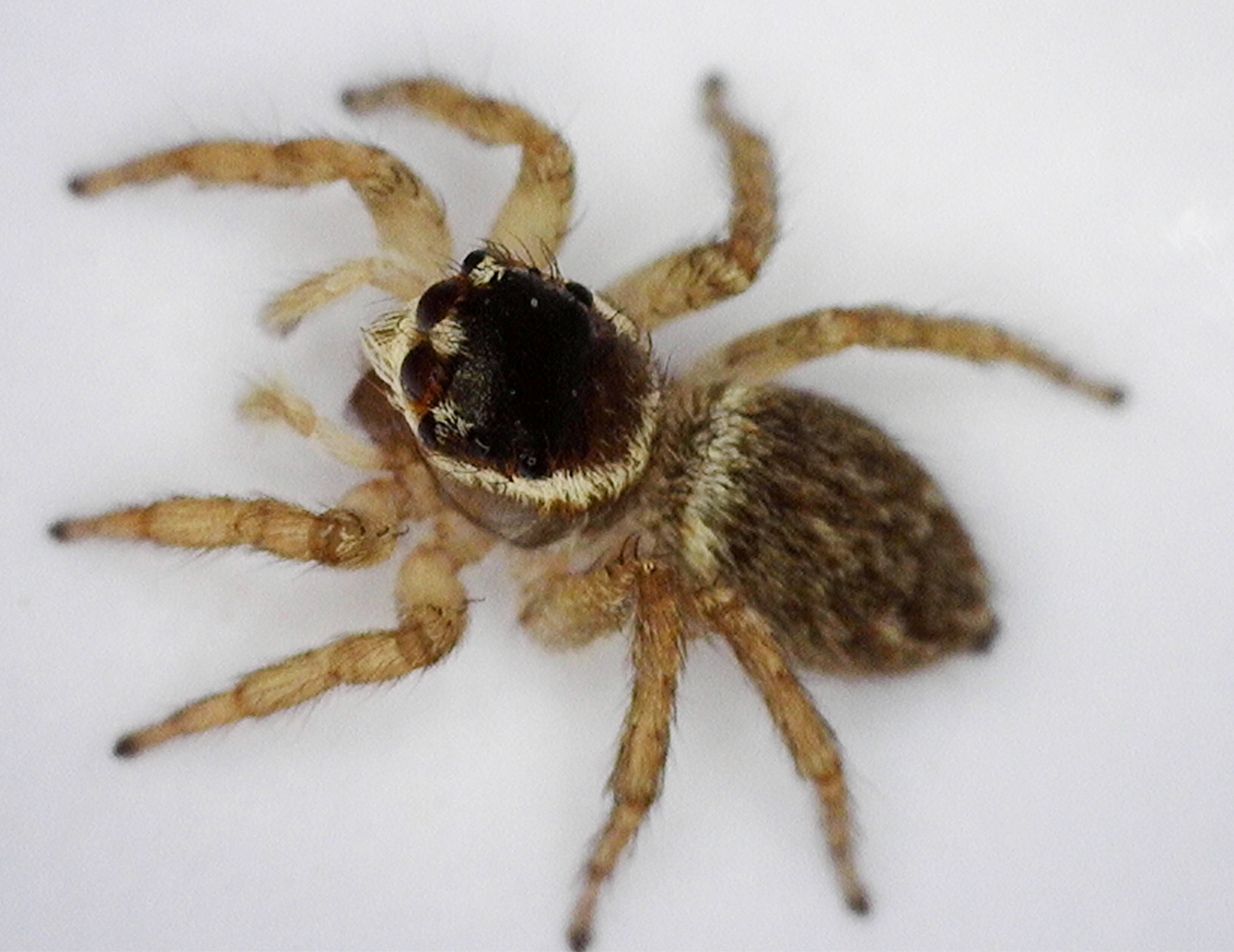

Scientific classification
- Kingdom: Animalia
- Phylum: Arthropoda
- Subphylum: Chelicerata
- Class: Arachnida
- Order: Araneae
- Infraorder: Araneomorphae
- Family: Salticidae
- Genus: Maratus
- Species: M. griseus

Binomial name
- Maratus griseus (Keyserling, 1882)

= Maratus griseus =

Species of spider

Maratus griseus, the white-banded house jumping spider, is a species of jumping spider in the family Salticidae. It is found in Australia and New Zealand.

== Description ==
This species is easily identified by its prominent features as part of the genus Maratus (peacock spiders). They are 2–6 mm in length, and have a rectangular or ovate abdomen, relatively short legs, and fangs or chelicerae which have a single tooth facing forward (retromarginal) and two teeth facing backward (promarginal). They have a rectangular cephalothorax (or head) when seen from above, which projects above the rest of the carapace. The head contains four pairs of eyes positioned in a straight horizontal row at the top of the head that wraps around the head like a halo, with each pair covering a particular visual angle. This eye positioning gives the spider excellent movement-based peripheral vision. The frontal pair of eyes appear closer together, more developed, and significantly bigger than the other pairs. This provides the spider with excellent binocular vision and particularly good depth perception, which is vital for the strategies used by this species to hunt prey.

Maratus griseus are generally brown or black, with the male more often presenting a darker colouration. Males also have a bright reddish-orange band of hairs above and below their eyes and thick white hairs that cover their palps; this unusual colouration plays a vital role in mating rituals. Females are typically dull brown or black with only a circular band of white hairs on the head that contrasts with their opaque colouration. This band appears in a shape that can resemble a circle or "halo" around the head.

== Geographic distribution and habitat ==
=== Range ===
This species is found in Australia and New Zealand. In Australia, it is typically found in the more temperate regions, including in the Australian Capital Territory, New South Wales, Queensland, South Australia, Tasmania, Victoria, and Western Australia. In New Zealand, it is found throughout the North Island and in the South Island.

=== Habitat preferences ===
This species is very adaptable and can be found from the seashore to the mountains of New Zealand as well as the temperate and subtropical forests of Australia, typically under leaf litter, around leaves, grass, or ferns as well as under rocks or logs. It is also commonly known to inhabit houses, where it can be spotted while hunting or performing its characteristic mating dances. It can occasionally be found in warmer and drier climates like Australian shrublands and dry grasslands.

== Phenology ==
This species is diurnal, mostly solitary, and has a lifespan of approximately one year. Its life cycle starts around austral spring (December/January) when these spiders hatch and, as with other salticid species, it is possible that the young spiders may stay with their mother until shortly after their first moult. However, details about the juvenile phase of this species, which typically occurs between December/January and the end of July, are limited and sightings of these spiders are less common during these times. In August, mature males start to appear more prominently, with the females emerging not long after. It is at this time that the mating and accompanying mating rituals of this species occur.

Members of the Maratus genus are known for their complex and flamboyant mating rituals. Even so, this spider has a rather unique mating behaviour compared to other members of its genus. This elaborate mating ritual begins when the male spider spots a female and proceeds with a particular mating dance; the male first stops and faces the direction of the female, then lifts his third pair of legs to signal her, raising his abdomen perpendicular to its body while swinging it from side to side. Once recognized by the female, he lowers his legs and starts to approach her very cautiously with zig-zag movements, slowly attempting to circle the female while closing the distance. His movement is wary, and he faces her at all times as he continues to swing his abdomen from side to side. The female at this point may run away, which may happen a few times, but she allows the male to get closer after each subsequent attempt. Once the male gets close enough (just a few centimetres from the female), he stops the swinging motion of his abdomen and sets it down while stretching out his front legs. Subsequently, he taps the female's legs and carapace gently with his palps and then attempts to climb on top of her to copulate.

If the female has already mated, she will reject the male by performing a particular dance that has only been observed in New Zealand spiders. If this case, the female will counter the male's dance by lifting both her legs and abdomen in the same way as the male and copying the swinging movement of his abdomen, mirroring him. If this happens, the male will stop his advance, and, if the female continues this behaviour while approaching the male, he will run away. This behaviour may send a signal to the male that the female is not interested and may become aggressive should he decide to stay.

After the mating season has ended (around December), females retreat into their nest to lay and then guard their eggs until they hatch, starting the cycle anew.

This species also has a particular behaviour when two males are in proximity to each other during the mating season and they perform a "competing dance". In this case, both males raise their third pairs of legs as well as their abdomens; however, instead of swinging their abdomens from side to side as they would to entice a female, they keep them immobile and bent to one side. In addition, the third pair of legs are kept raised as both approach each other, unlike in the mating dance where these are lowered when the male tries to close in on the female. Furthermore, in this instance, the males use both their abdomens and their third pair of legs as signalling devices while advancing toward each other, but they close the distance by zig-zagging. Once the approach is complete and both males are in front of each other they spread out their third pair of legs, their palps, and their fangs such that each limb may touch the opponent's opposing appendages at the tip. When these make contact typically one male will retreat, and the confrontation will end.

These spiders are not considered territorial since it has been observed that if two males are put together in an enclosure and they complete the competing behaviour detailed above, both males will ignore each other afterward and no further agonistic behaviour will occur. However, if one or both males are removed from the enclosure and then put again in close proximity to each other, the competing dance is repeated. The same male that withdrew the first time will withdraw in any subsequent competing dance.

== Diet, prey, predators ==
=== Diet ===
Spiders of this species generally prey on other invertebrates, which can be significantly larger than themselves. Observations of this predatory behaviour include various species of flies, moths, and butterflies. The family Salticidae, to which this species belongs, is also known for eating other spiders as well as any insect that they are able to subdue.

The hunting tactics these spiders use to catch their prey, much like their mating behaviour, are unique. Unlike other spiders, this species does not build webs to trap their prey; instead, they actively track it and ambush it. This is possible due to their highly developed eyesight which gives them excellent binocular vision and depth perception, as well as a near 360-degree visual awareness due to the positioning of their eye pairs, which allows these spiders to keep a visual lock on their prey as they hunt and pounce accurately when within striking distance. Once a prey item has been located, the spider stalks it and approaches it carefully often using its web as a tool to traverse the environment (i.e. using it as a rope to climb down) until the spider is in striking distance. Once in this position, the spider pounces on its prey, grabbing it with its frontal limbs and then, as with any other spider, using its fangs to inject venom and digestive enzymes which kill the prey and help break it down so the spider may injest it through its hypodermic fangs.

=== Predators, parasites, and diseases ===
There are scant records of species-specific predatory for this species. However, it is assumed that much like other Salticidae, it may be preyed upon by birds, small reptiles, and mammals as well as some other invertebrates. However, one parasitoid has been recorded preying upon this spider; Pison peletieri (the mason wasp). This wasp has been observed catching Maratus griseus and subsequently dragging the spider to its nest. Once the spider is trapped in the nest, the wasp parasitizes the spider by injecting it with its eggs which then hatch inside it and wasp larvae emerge consuming the spider from the inside out.

== Other information ==
As part of the Salticidae family, this species has specific adaptations to its eyes that recently have been better understood. For example, unlike other spider families, they lack the light-sensitive tapeta on the lateral eyes which are made of guanine crystals and function as a mirror that reflects the light that could not be absorbed by the spider's photoreceptors back into the eyes, giving the light photons another chance to be absorbed. This adaptation significantly increases light sensitivity and allows spiders to see in the dark. These spiders lack this adaptation because though it can provide better light sensitivity, it reduces the spatial resolution due to an increase in the light scattering which would interfere with the clarity and acuity of the image. These spiders use their eyesight as their primary sensory organ and require an accurate image to hunt their prey. This may also partly explain why these spiders are mostly diurnal.

Another important adaptation in the Salticidae family is the retinal muscles. This adaptation is not uncommon in the principal set of eyes; however, spiders in this family have six highly-developed retinal muscles allowing them a 50-degree displacement motion on their retina which is significantly higher than in most spiders. This means that these spiders can focus with accuracy on objects without having to rotate their body, which gives them a significant advantage since they do not need to betray their position to prey or potential predators to focus their sight.
