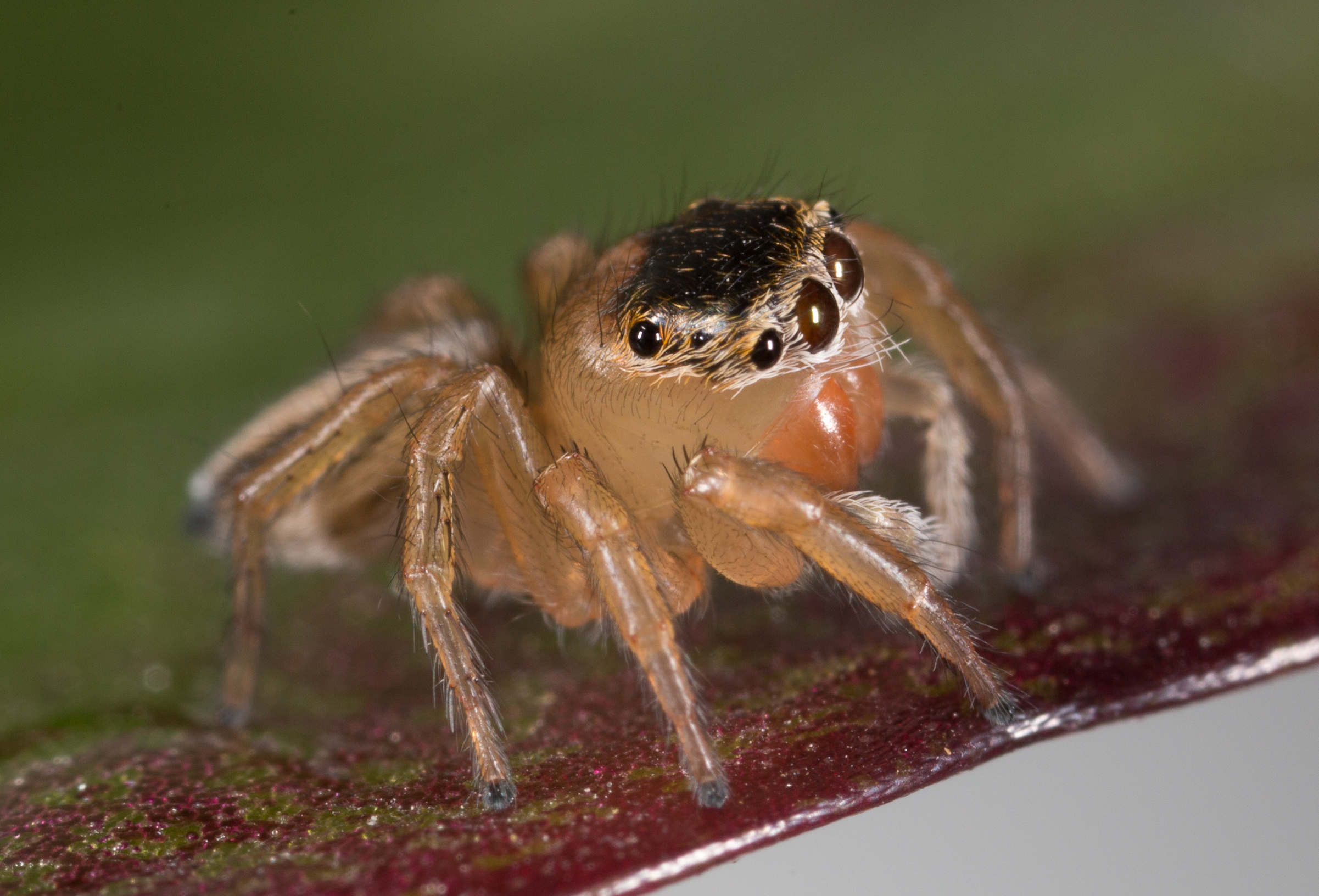

Scientific classification
- Kingdom: Animalia
- Phylum: Arthropoda
- Subphylum: Chelicerata
- Class: Arachnida
- Order: Araneae
- Infraorder: Araneomorphae
- Family: Salticidae
- Genus: Maratus
- Species: M. scutulatus

Binomial name
- Maratus scutulatus L.Koch 1881

Synonyms
- Ergane scutulata Keyserling; Lycidas scutulatus; Sigytes scutulatus; Hypoblemum albovittatum

= Maratus scutulatus =

Species of spider

Maratus scutulatus is a species of Australian spider in the family Salticidae.

== Description ==
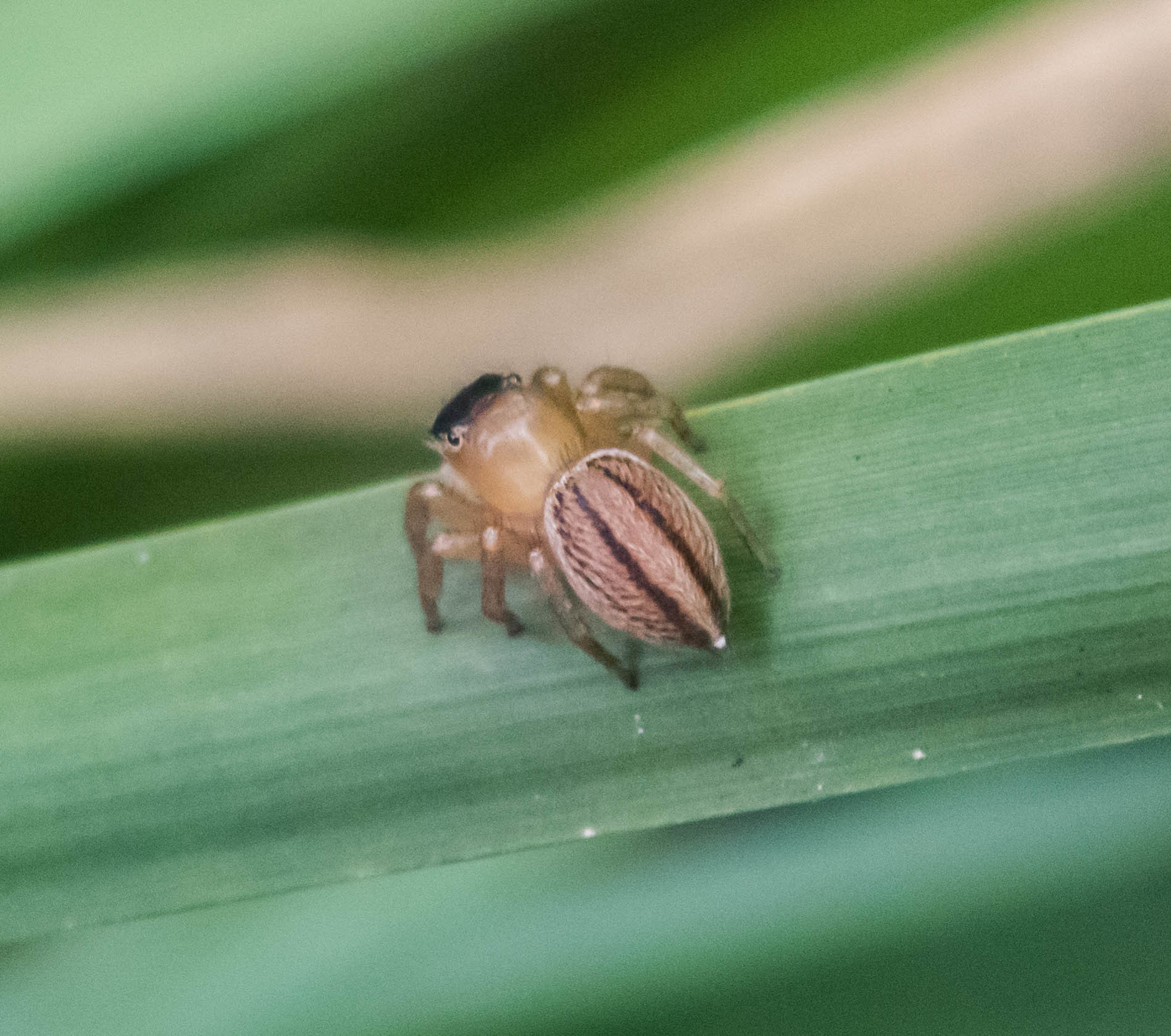
Observation of M. scutulatus.

The female body length is 7 mm, the male to 5 mm. Food is small insects. Often seen on bark of trees or foliage in moist areas of eastern Australia.
