= Euochin albopalpalis =

Scientific classification
- Kingdom: Animalia
- Phylum: Arthropoda
- Subphylum: Chelicerata
- Class: Arachnida
- Order: Araneae
- Infraorder: Araneomorphae
- Family: Salticidae
- Genus: Euochin
- Species: E. albopalpalis

Binomial name
- Euochin albopalpalis (Bao & Peng, 2002)

Synonyms
- Euophrys albopalpalis Bao & Peng, 2002

Species of spider

Euochin albopalpalis, synonym Euophrys albopalpalis, is a species of jumping spiders found in mainland China and Taiwan. It is a tiny spider with a total length (excluding legs) of less than 3 mm. The sparsely hairy carapace is dark brown with black margins and a black w-shaped mark about halfway along the back. The legs are dark brown and marked with yellowish-brown rings. The oval abdomen is marked dorsally with two light triangular markings followed by four light curved lines.

The main distinguishing feature between this species and the similar Euophrys nepalica is the presence of dense white hairs on the palps.
