= Maratus combustus =

Scientific classification
- Kingdom: Animalia
- Phylum: Arthropoda
- Subphylum: Chelicerata
- Class: Arachnida
- Order: Araneae
- Infraorder: Araneomorphae
- Family: Salticidae
- Genus: Maratus
- Species: M. combustus

Binomial name
- Maratus combustus Schubert, 2019

Species of peacock spider

Maratus combustus is a species of peacock spider native to Australia. The species was discovered together with Maratus felinus and Maratus aquilus by a research group from Monash University, near Lake Jasper in the South West region of Western Australia. However, the ranges of each species do not overlap.

== Description ==
The spider has a medium-dark burnt orange colour on its abdomen. Like other Maratus species, it is very small. Male spiders are brighter coloured than female spiders.
