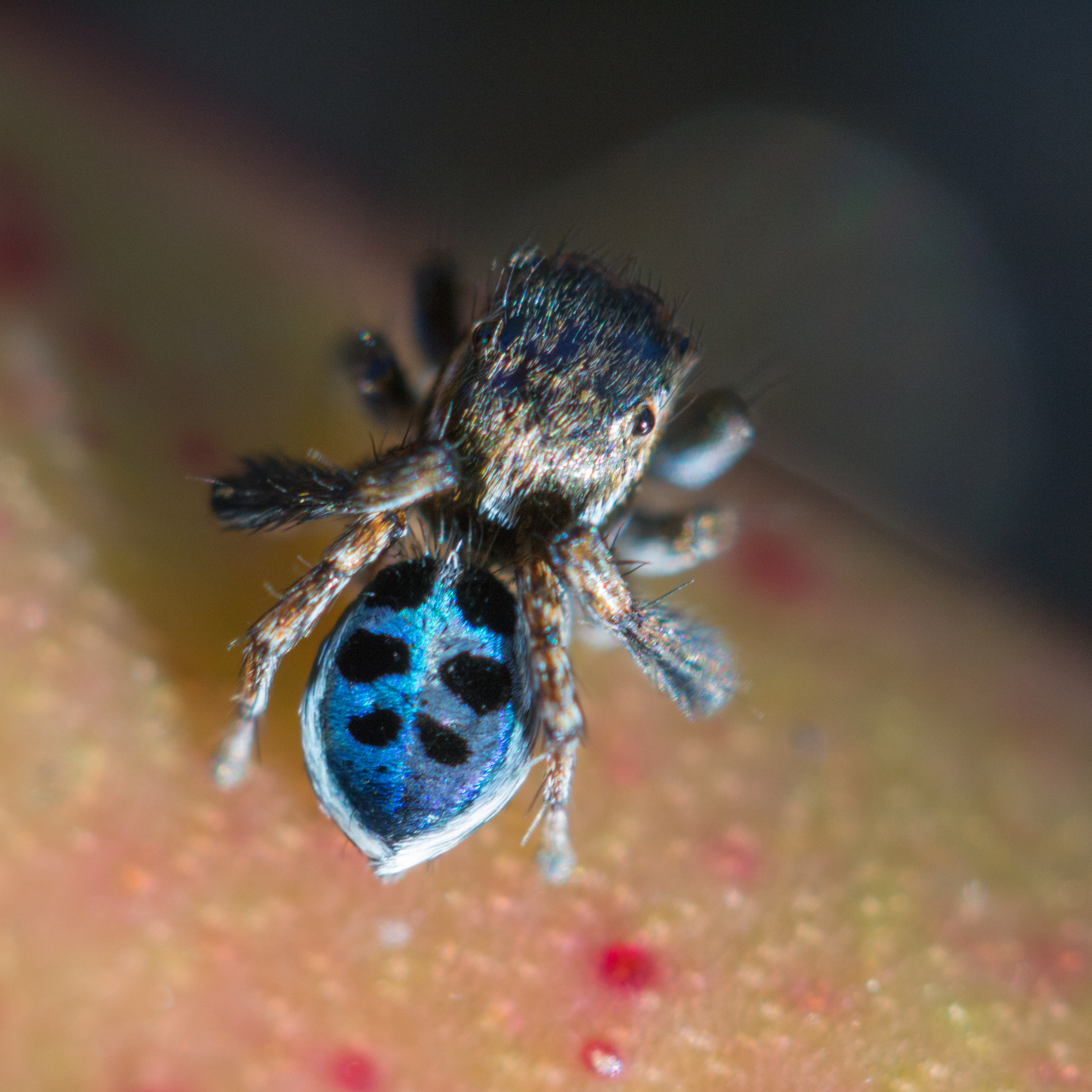
- Male

Scientific classification
- Kingdom: Animalia
- Phylum: Arthropoda
- Subphylum: Chelicerata
- Class: Arachnida
- Order: Araneae
- Infraorder: Araneomorphae
- Family: Salticidae
- Genus: Maratus
- Species: M. nigromaculatus

Binomial name
- Maratus nigromaculatus (Keyserling 1883)

Synonyms
- Ergane nigromaculata Keyserling 1883; Spilargis nigromaculataSimon, 1903; Thorellia nigromaculataRainbow, 1911; Lycidas nigromaculatusŻabka, 1987

= Maratus nigromaculatus =

Species of spider

Maratus nigromaculatus is a species of the genus Maratus (peacock spiders), an Australian member of the jumping spider family. Described in 1883 by Keyserling as Ergane nigromaculata from a specimen from Rockhampton, they are found in Queensland. The species name is derived from the Latin words niger "black" and maculatus "spotted".
