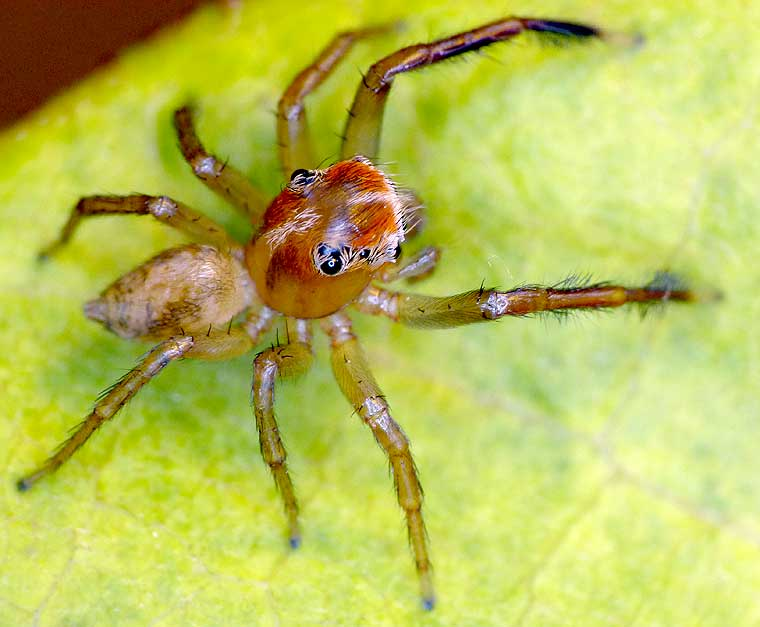
- Prostheclina pallida

Scientific classification
- Kingdom: Animalia
- Phylum: Arthropoda
- Subphylum: Chelicerata
- Class: Arachnida
- Order: Araneae
- Infraorder: Araneomorphae
- Family: Salticidae
- Subfamily: Salticinae
- Genus: Prostheclina; Keyserling, 1882

Type species
- P. pallida Keyserling, 1882

Species
- 7, see text

= Prostheclina =

Genus of spiders

Prostheclina is a genus of Australian jumping spiders that was first described by Eugen von Keyserling in 1882.

== Species ==
Until 2007, only one species from this genus was known. As of August 2019 it contains seven species, found only in Australia:

- Prostheclina amplior Richardson & Zabka, 2007 – Australia (Queensland to Tasmania)
- Prostheclina basilonesa Richardson & Zabka, 2007 – Australia (Victoria, Tasmania)
- Prostheclina boreoaitha Richardson & Zabka, 2007 – Australia (Queensland)
- Prostheclina boreoxantha Richardson & Zabka, 2007 – Australia (Queensland)
- Prostheclina bulburin Richardson & Zabka, 2007 – Australia (Queensland)
- Prostheclina eungella Richardson & Zabka, 2007 – Australia (Queensland)
- Prostheclina pallida Keyserling, 1882 (type) – Eastern Australia
