= Euochin =

Scientific classification
- Kingdom: Animalia
- Phylum: Arthropoda
- Subphylum: Chelicerata
- Class: Arachnida
- Order: Araneae
- Infraorder: Araneomorphae
- Family: Salticidae
- Subfamily: Salticinae
- Tribe: Euophryini
- Genus: Euochin; Prószyński, 2018

Type species
- Euophrys atrata Song & Chai, 1992

Species
- 11, See text.

Genus of spiders

Euochin is a genus of east Asian jumping spiders first described by Jerzy Prószyński in 2018. The genus was split off from Euophrys. Prószyński placed the genus in his informal group "euophrydeae" within the "euophryines", the latter being equivalent to the tribe Euophryini, which is part of the subfamily Salticinae.

== Species ==
As of August 2022 it contains eleven species:

- Euochin albopalpalis (Bao & Peng, 2002) — China, Taiwan
- Euochin atrata (Song & Chai, 1992) — China
- Euochin bulbus (Bao & Peng, 2002) — China, Taiwan
- Euochin kororensis (Berry, Beatty & Prószyński, 1996) — Micronesia (Caroline Is.)
- Euochin luzonica Logunov, 2020 — Philippines (Luzon)
- Euochin mii Wang & Li, 2022 — China
- Euochin poloi (Zabka, 1985) — Vietnam
- Euochin subwanyan (Wang & Li, 2020) — China
- Euochin tangi Wang & Li, 2022 — China
- Euochin wanyan (Berry, Beatty & Prószyński, 1996) — Micronesia (Caroline Is.)
- Euochin yaoi Wang & Li, 2021 — China
