= Maratus harrisi =

Scientific classification
- Kingdom: Animalia
- Phylum: Arthropoda
- Subphylum: Chelicerata
- Class: Arachnida
- Order: Araneae
- Infraorder: Araneomorphae
- Family: Salticidae
- Genus: Maratus
- Species: M. harrisi

Binomial name
- Maratus harrisi Otto & Hill, 2011

Species of spider

Maratus harrisi is a species of the genus Maratus (peacock spiders), an Australian member of the jumping spider family. It was described in 2011 and is native to the Australian Capital Territory.

The species is named after its discoverer, Stuart Harris, a Canberran vineyard worker and amateur photographer, who first came across the spider in Namadgi National Park in December 2008. Harris posted a photograph of the spider to his Flickr account soon after and it was noticed by spider researcher David Hill.
