= Microhasarius =

Scientific classification
- Kingdom: Animalia
- Phylum: Arthropoda
- Subphylum: Chelicerata
- Class: Arachnida
- Order: Araneae
- Infraorder: Araneomorphae
- Family: Salticidae
- Subfamily: Salticinae
- Genus: Microhasarius; Simon, 1902

Type species
- Microhasarius pauperculus Simon, 1902

Species
- See text.

Genus of spiders

Microhasarius is a spider genus of the jumping spider family, Salticidae.

== Description ==
Microhasarius have a yellowish-red carapace with a very thin black margin. The cephalus and each side are black with some long whitish-yellow hairs. The abdomen is pale brown with a few dark spots and a dark, median stripe.

== Distribution ==
M. pauperculus is only known from Java, M. animosus only from Sarawak in northern Borneo.

== Name ==
The genus name is combined from "micro" (Greek μικρός for "small") and Hasarius.

== Species ==
- Microhasarius animosus Peckham & Peckham, 1907 — Borneo
- Microhasarius pauperculus Simon, 1902 — Java
