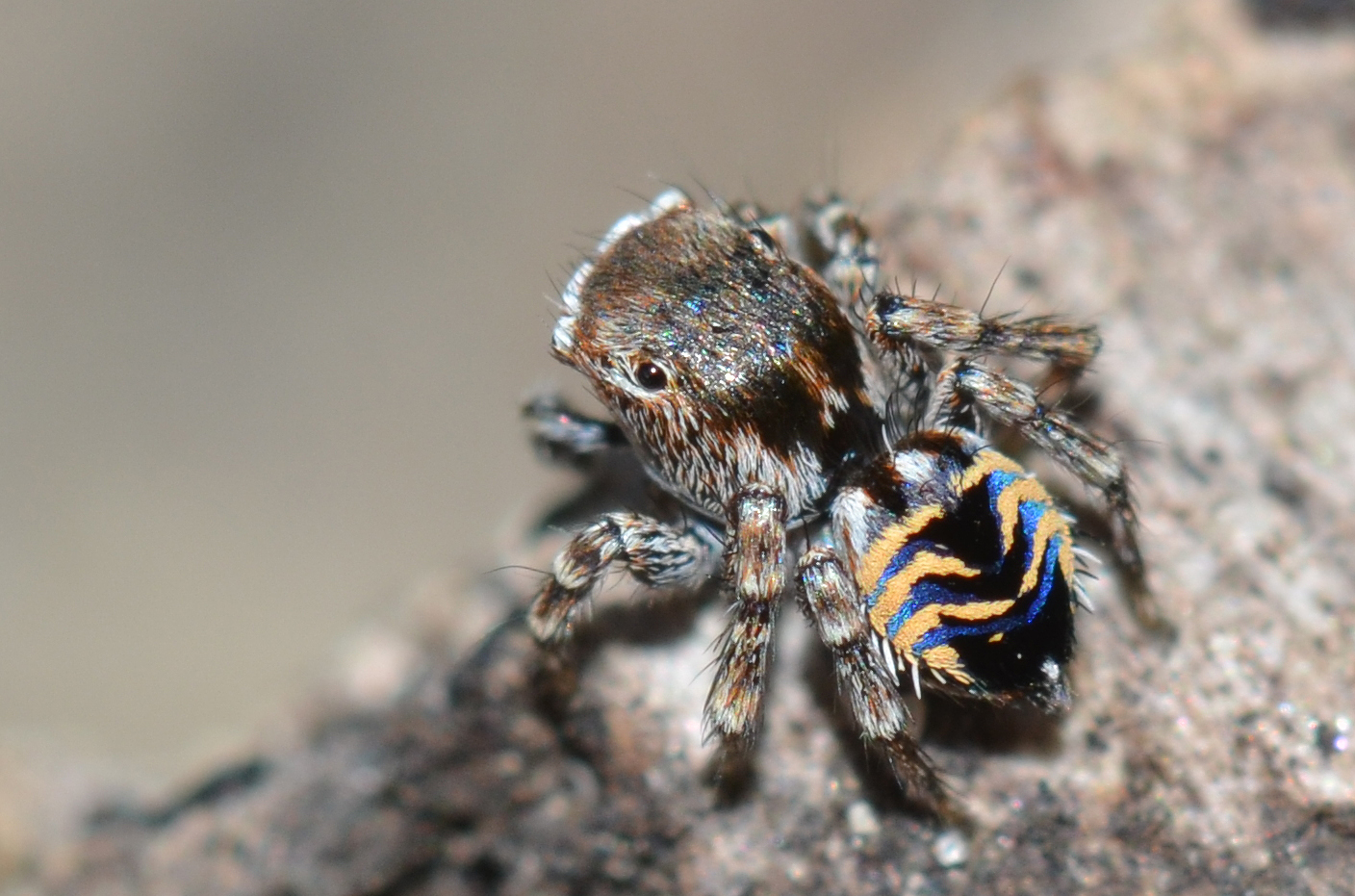
- male

Scientific classification
- Kingdom: Animalia
- Phylum: Arthropoda
- Subphylum: Chelicerata
- Class: Arachnida
- Order: Araneae
- Infraorder: Araneomorphae
- Family: Salticidae
- Genus: Maratus
- Species: M. spicatus

Binomial name
- Maratus spicatus Otto & Hill, 2012

= Maratus spicatus =

Species of spider

Maratus spicatus is a species of the genus Maratus (peacock spiders), an Australian member of the jumping spider family. It was described in 2012 and is native to Western Australia.

== Image gallery ==
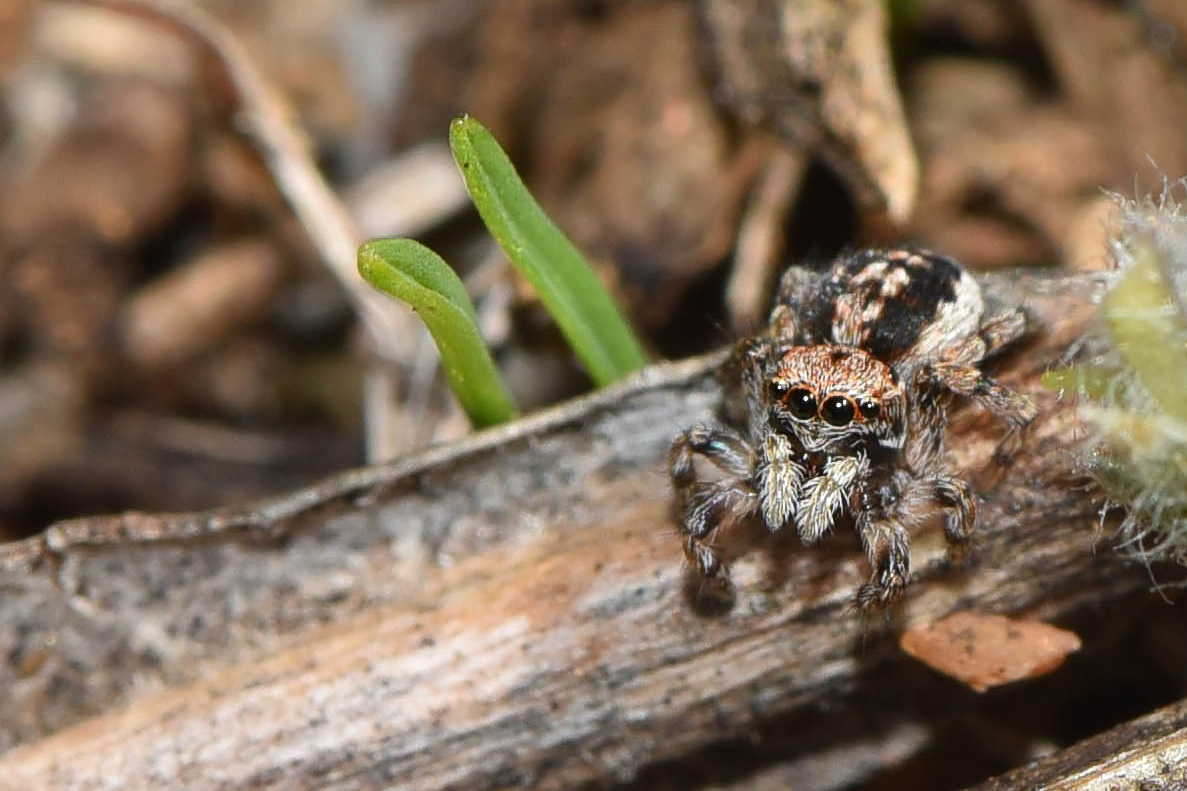

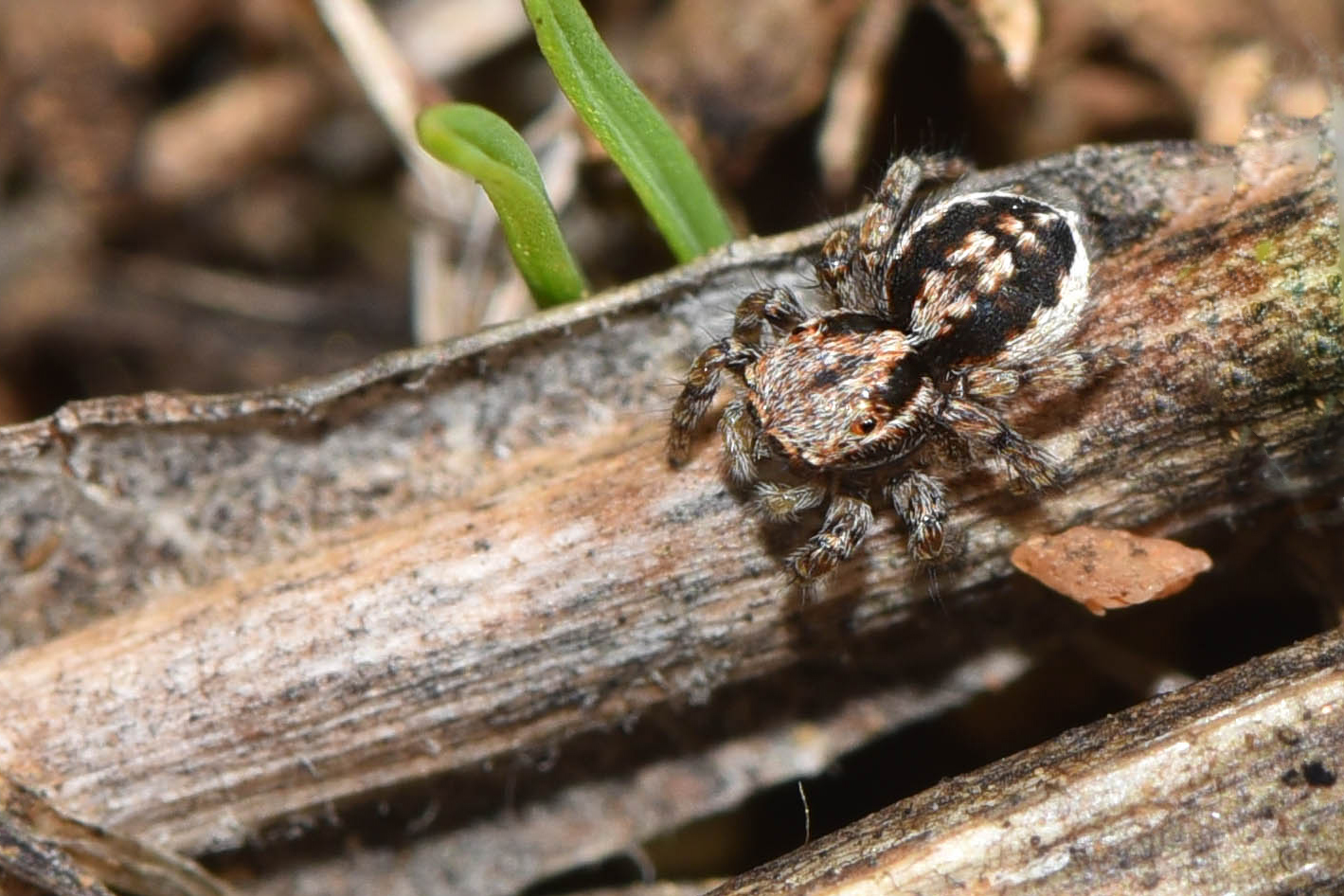
