= Wondul Range National Park =

National park in Australia

- IUCN category II (national park)
- Location within Queensland
- Location: Queensland
- Nearest city: Millmerran
- Coordinates: 28°03′48″S 151°01′20″E
- Area: 35.55 km^{2} (13.73 sq mi)
- Established: 1992
- Governing body: Queensland Parks and Wildlife Service

Wondul Range is a national park in Queensland, Australia, 209 km west of Brisbane. It is located in the Toowoomba Region local government area of the Darling Downs. The park aims to conserve open woodland species typical of the Western Downs.

It lies within the water catchment area of the Macintyre River and Weir Rivers in the Brigalow Belt South bioregion. Whetstone State Forest lies to the south and Bulli State Forest to the west, both adjacent to the national park.

A total of five rare or threatened species have been identified within Wondul Range National Park. The park has no facilities. The main recreational activities undertaken in the park are bird watching and wildlife observation.

== See also ==
- Protected areas of Queensland
