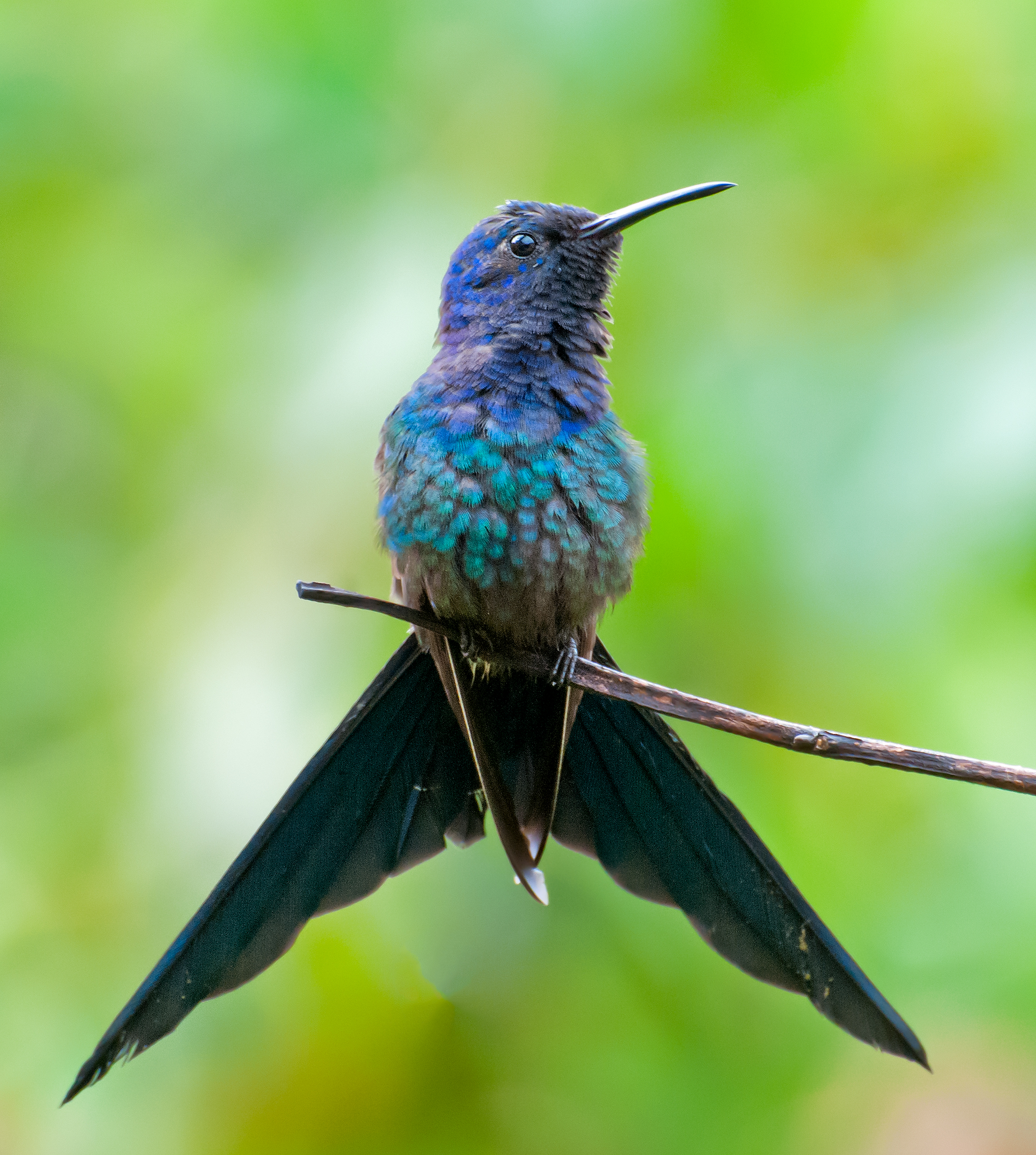
- Adult in Piraju, São Paulo, Brazil

Conservation status
- Least Concern (IUCN 3.1)
- CITES Appendix II

Scientific classification
- Kingdom: Animalia
- Phylum: Chordata
- Class: Aves
- Clade: Strisores
- Order: Apodiformes
- Family: Trochilidae
- Genus: Eupetomena
- Species: E. macroura

Binomial name
- Eupetomena macroura (Gmelin, JF, 1788)

Synonyms
- Campylopterus macrourus (Gmelin, 1788) (but see text); Trochilus macrourus Gmelin, 1788

= Swallow-tailed hummingbird =

Swallow-tailed humming bird

Species of bird

The swallow-tailed hummingbird (Eupetomena macroura) is a species in the hummingbird family (Trochilidae), found mainly in east-central South America. Most authorities place it in the genus Eupetomena, although some place it in Campylopterus based on song and the thick shafts of the males' first primaries. Its common name and specific epithet (which means "large-tailed") both refer to the long, deeply forked, somewhat swallow-like tail.

== Taxonomy ==
The swallow-tailed hummingbird was formally described in 1788 by the German naturalist Johann Friedrich Gmelin in his revised and expanded edition of Carl Linnaeus's Systema Naturae. He placed it with all the other hummingbirds in the genus Trochilus, coined the binomial name Trochilus macrourus and specified the type locality as Jamaica. Gmelin cited earlier authors including Hans Sloane who in 1725 had described and illustrated a humming bird from Jamaica and Mathurin Jacques Brisson who in 1760, had described and illustrated a hummingbird from Cayenne, French Guiana. In 1929 Carl Eduard Hellmayr argued that Gmelin conflated two different species and that his diagnosis applied to Brisson's specimen from Cayenne; Sloane's Jamaican bird was probably the red-billed streamertail. Hellmayr therefore redesignated the type locality as Cayenne. The swallow-tailed hummingbird is now placed together with the sombre hummingbird in the genus Eupetomena that was introduced in 1853 by the English ornithologist John Gould. The genus name combines the Ancient Greek eu meaning "good" and petomenos meaning "always on the wing" or "flying" (from petomai "to fly"). The specific epithet macroura is from the Ancient Greek makros meaning "long" and -ouros meaning "-tailed".

Five subspecies are recognised, the most recent was described in 1988.

- E. m. macroura (Gmelin, JF, 1788) – the Guianas, north, central, southeast Brazil, Paraguay and northeast Argentina
- E. m. simoni Hellmayr, 1929 – northeast Brazil
- E. m. cyanoviridis Grantsau, 1988 – southeast Brazil
- E. m. hirundo Gould, 1875 – east Peru
- E. m. boliviana Zimmer, JT, 1950 – northwest Bolivia

== Description ==
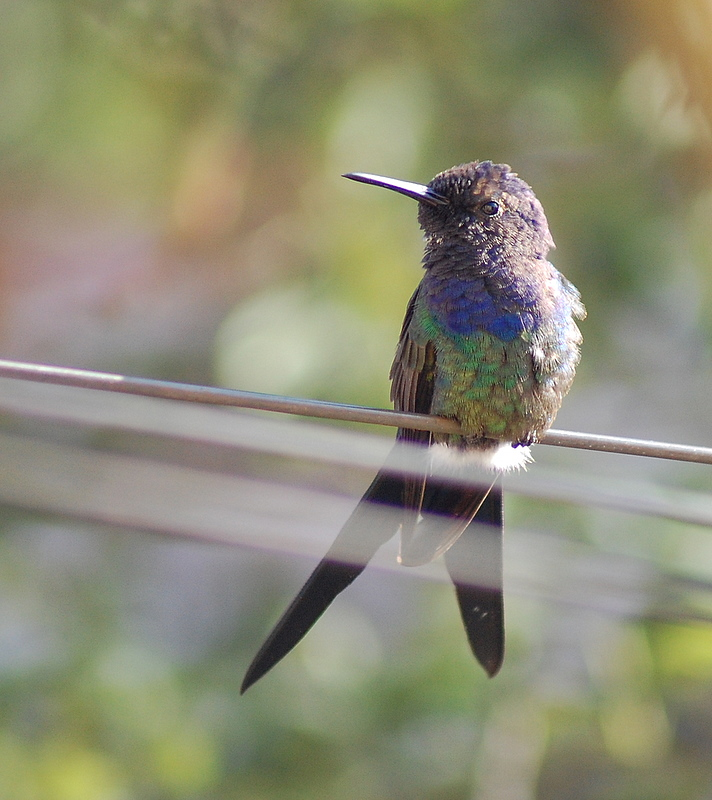
Showing forked tail. Photographed in Piraju, São Paulo, Brazil

With a total length of 15–17 cm (6–6 1/2 in), nearly half of which is made up by the tail, and weighing up to 9 g (0.32 oz), this is a relatively large hummingbird. Indeed, in much of its range it is the largest species of typical hummingbird. Its wings are also nearly 8 cm long – quite much for its size by hummingbird standards – though its bill is only of mediocre length, with c. 21 mm (0.83 in) not longer in absolute terms than that of many smaller relatives.

Its plumage is brilliant iridescent green, with a blue head, upper chest, tail and vent. The tiny white spot behind the eye, common among hummingbirds, is often not visible in this species, but the white ankle tufts, also common among the Trochilinae, are well-developed. The remiges are blackish-brown. It has a slightly decurved medium-long black bill. The sexes are very similar, but females are about one-fourth smaller and slightly duller than males on average. Immature birds appear like females, but their heads are particularly dull and brownish-tinged.

The subspecies vary mainly in the hue of the plumage, with the blue sections ranging from green-tinged blue over ultramarine to deep royal blue, and the green sections ranging from golden bronzy-green over deep bottle-green to blue-tinged green. The nominate subspecies and E. m. simoni occur over a wide range, while the others are more localized endemics. For E. m. hirundo the blue quite dull and the tail less deeply forked. E. m. simoni is the bluest subspecies; the blue parts are dark royal blue, the green parts blue-tinged. E. m. bolivianus is the greenest subspecies; the head is more green than blue and the green parts pure bright green. E. m. cyanoviridis is another very green subspecies with the blue parts green-tinged and the green parts golden bronzy green.

Its voice includes relatively loud psek notes and weaker twitters. A tik call is given when excited or alarmed.

The swallow-tailed hummingbird is virtually unmistakable, although occasionally confused with the male violet-capped woodnymph (Thalurania glaucopis). These have only a blue cap however, the remainder of their head is the same green as the belly.

== Distribution and habitat ==
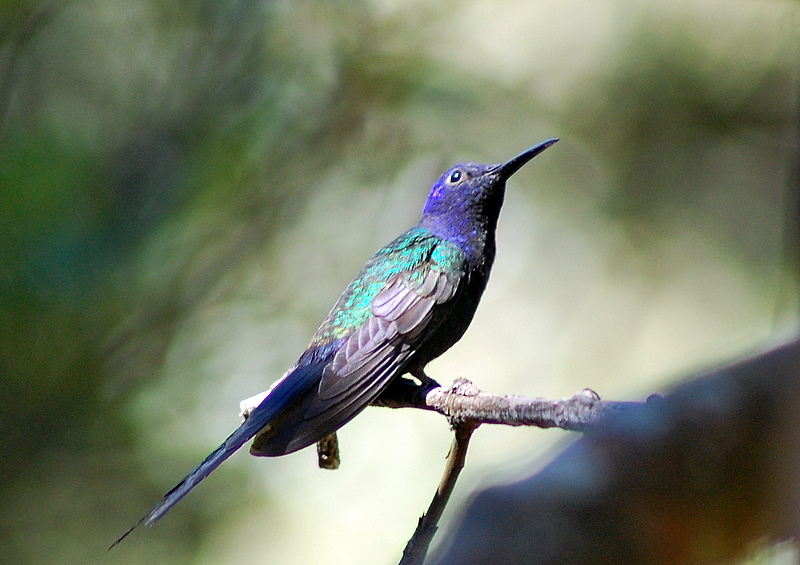
Adult, from São Paulo Botanical Garden, Brazil

The majority of the range of the swallow-tailed hummingbird is in the Caatinga and Cerrado of Brazil, and adjacent parts of northern and eastern Bolivia, and far northern Paraguay. In the coastal regions, it occurs from French Guiana in north to Santa Catarina, Brazil, in south.

It generally avoids the rainforest found throughout most of the Amazon Basin, and only extends locally into this region along the southern and eastern edge, in the relatively open habitats along the lowermost sections of the Amazon River, including Marajó Island, and upstream to around the Tapajós River, and in isolated enclaves of woodland or savanna-like habitats within the Amazon (including so-called "Amazonian Caatinga") in south-eastern Peru (upper Urubamba River and Pampas del Heath), southern Suriname (Sipaliwini Savanna), central Brazil, and northern Bolivia.

It occurs in virtually any semi-open habitat; even gardens and parks within major cities such as Rio de Janeiro and São Paulo. It avoids the interior of humid forest, but does occur in openings or along the edge; the swallow-tailed hummingbird is most common among savanna-like vegetation. It is generally a species of lowlands, but occurs locally up to 1,500 m (4,900 ft). Not a true migrant, some populations move north or south a short distance in the dry winter months.

Throughout the bulk of its range, it is among the commonest species of hummingbird, although it generally is uncommon in the outlying regions, particularly where it becomes more humid. In southern Brazil, it is apparently increasing and seems to have extended its range in recent decades. It is considered to be a Species of Least Concern by the IUCN. It was frequently exported for the cage bird trade up to 1970, but like other hummingbirds, it is nowadays on CITES Appendix II and trade is restricted. Also, hummingbirds are generally hard to keep in captivity, and though this species is generally rather hardy, it has been noted that abandoned young may die despite given optimal treatment when trying to hand-raise them.

== Behaviour and ecology ==
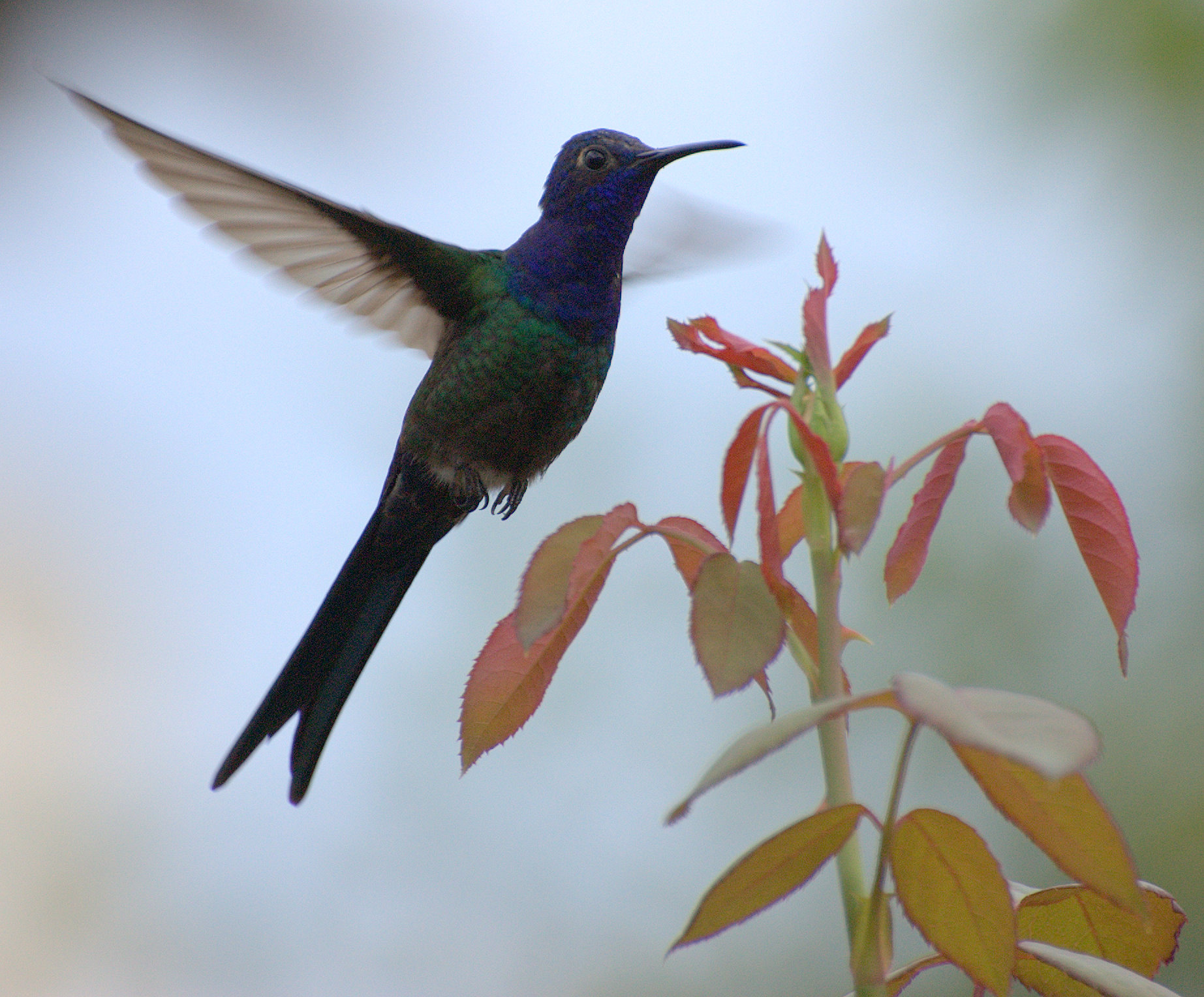
Hovering adult photographed near Piraju, São Paulo, Brazil

It is aggressive and will defend rich food sources from other nectarivores; due to its size, it is generally dominant over other species of hummingbirds. Even much larger birds are attacked by diving at them when they perch; particularly when breeding the swallow-tailed hummingbird will go and "dive-bomb" birds twice its own length or more, such as Campo flickers (Colaptes campestris), curl-crested jays (Cyanocorax cristatellus) or smooth-billed anis (Crotophaga ani), until they have enough and leave. Disturbed by much larger birds such as Guira cuckoos (Guira guira) or hawks, it will usually just give warning calls, but a female swallow-tailed hummingbird has been observed to attack a Swainson's hawk (Buteo swainsonii) – weighing more than a hundred times as much as the hummingbird – in mid-air. Warning calls are also given at mammalian carnivores and humans, though in urban environment this hummingbird may tolerate human observers for prolonged time, even when nesting, if they keep a distance of 10 meters or so.

In a study of a nest in urban São Paulo, it was noted that the swallow-tailed hummingbird mother drove away ruddy ground doves (Columbina talpacoti) attempting to nest nearby. Far more placid, cumbersome and meaty birds than the hummingbird, these small doves often become prey to smaller carnivores, and by chasing away the doves the hummingbird would have lowered attractiveness to its nest's surroundings to such predators. Smaller mammals, such as the common marmoset (Callithrix jacchus) may occasionally plunder swallow-tailed hummingbird nests, despite the birds' attempts to defend their offspring.

At least in some situations, Philornis botfly larvae heavily infest nestling birds. It seems that quite a considerable number of nestlings are even killed by these parasites.

=== Food and feeding ===
The swallow-tailed hummingbird mainly forages at mid-levels, but good food sources are exploited from anywhere near ground level right up to the tree tops. It chiefly feeds on flower nectar, particularly from Fabaceae, Gesneriaceae, Malvaceae (especially Bombacoideae and Malvoideae), Myrtaceae, Rubiaceae and epiphytic Bromeliaceae. It is not a very specialized feeder however, and has also been recorded from plants of other families, such as Asteraceae or Caryocaraceae. It utilizes flowers of native as well as those of some introduced ornamental plants. It will also take insects caught by hawking. In south-eastern Brazil where it is plentiful even in urban parks and gardens, it is commonly attracted to hummingbird feeders.

=== Breeding ===
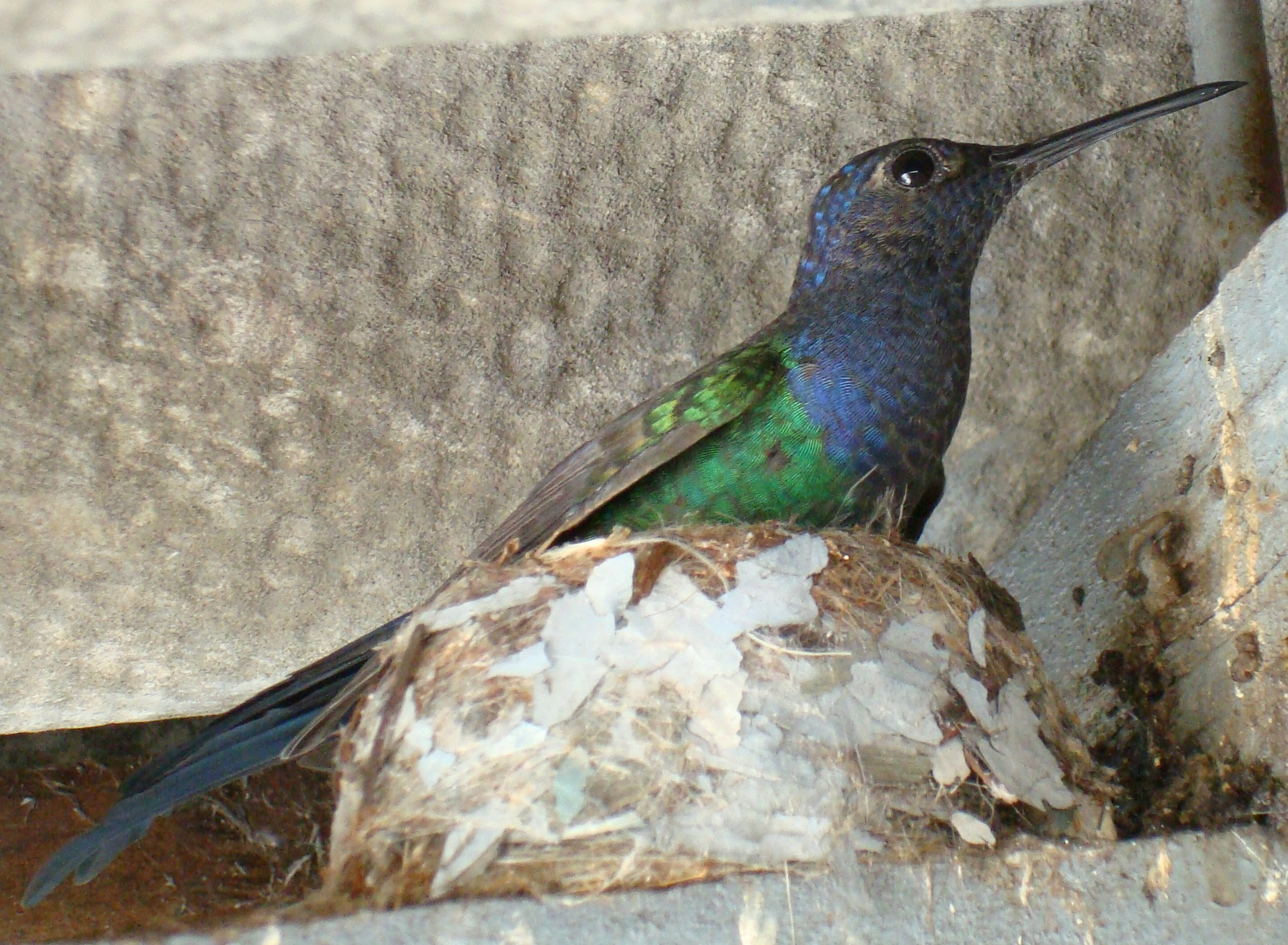
On nest in Ribeirão Preto, São Paulo, Brazil

Across its range, it can be found to engage in some behavior related to reproduction almost year-round. In courtship, the male hovers in front of the sitting female and chases her through the air, and the two may beform a 'zig-zag flight' together; the former activity can be seen throughout the day except in the hottest hours around noon, while courtship chases are most frequent at dusk.

Birds have been seen carrying nesting material between July and September and in December. The nest is a cup-shaped structure lined with soft plant fibres and clad on the outside with lichen and mosses, held together with spider webs. It is placed on a horizontal twig in smallish trees, e.g. Cochlospermum, typically below 3 m (10 ft), but occasionally as high as 15 m (50 ft) above the ground. The clutch consist of two white eggs and like in other hummingbirds. Only the female takes care of the eggs and young.

The chicks hatch after 15–16 days; they are initially hairless, save for some grey down on the back, and have dark skin. They start to grow feathers 5 days or so after hatching, starting with the remiges; the rectrices begin to emerge about 3 days later. The young are fed 1-2 times per hour on average, and the female spends about half of the day brooding and feeding her offspring, and the other half flying around and feeding. The young fledge after 22–24 days but still return to the nest to sleep and be brooded for some more days; they are independent some 2–3 weeks after fledging. Two broods may be raised subsequently, sometimes reusing the nest; due to the prolonged breeding season, three broods might be raised per year in theory, but this does not seem to happen. The species first breeds at 1–2 years of age.

== Sources ==
- Baza Mendonça, Luciana & dos Anjos, Luiz (2005): Beija-flores (Aves, Trochilidae) e seus recursos florais em uma área urbana do Sul do Brasil [Hummingbirds (Aves, Trochilidae) and their flowers in an urban area of southern Brazil]. Revista Brasileira de Zoologia 22(1): 51–59 [Portuguese with English abstract]. doi:10.1590/S0101-81752005000100007 PDF fulltext
- Baza Mendonça, Luciana & dos Anjos, Luiz (2006): Feeding behavior of hummingbirds and perching birds on Erythrina speciosa Andrews (Fabaceae) flowers in an urban area, Londrina, Paraná, Brazil [Hummingbirds (Aves, Trochilidae) and their flowers in an urban area of southern Brazil]. Revista Brasileira de Zoologia 23(1): 42–49 [English with Portuguese abstract]. doi:10.1590/S0101-81752006000100002 PDF fulltext
- de Lyra-Neves, Rachel M.; Oliveira, Maria A.B.; Telino-Júnior, Wallace R. & dos Santos, Ednilza M. (2007): Comportamentos interespecíficos entre Callithrix jacchus (Linnaeus) (Primates, Callitrichidae) e algumas aves de Mata Atlântica, Pernambuco, Brasil [Interspecific behaviour between Callithrix jacchus (Linnaeus) (Callitrichidae, Primates) and some birds of the Atlantic forest, Pernanbuco State, Brazil]. Revista Brasileira de Zoologia 24(3): 709–716 [Portuguese with English abstract]. doi:10.1590/S0101-81752007000300022 PDF fulltext.
- Grantsau, R. (1988): Beija-flores do Brasil ["Hummingbirds of Brazil"]. Expressão e Cultura, Rio de Janeiro [In Portuguese]. p. 57.ISBN 85-208-0100-5
- Melo, C. (2001): Diurnal bird visiting of Caryocar brasiliense Camb. in Central Brazil. Revista Brasileira de Biologia 61(2): 311–316. doi:10.1590/S0034-71082001000200014 PDF fulltext
- Oniki, Y. & Willis, E.O. (2000): Nesting behavior of the swallow-tailed hummingbird, Eupetomena macroura (Trochilidae, Aves). Revista Brasileira de Biologia 60(4): 655-662 [English with Portuguese abstract]. doi:10.1590/S0034-71082000000400016 PDF fulltext
- Restall, R.; Rodner, C. & Lentino, M. (2006): Birds of Northern South America. Christopher Helm, London. ISBN 0-7136-7243-9 (vol. 1), ISBN 0-7136-7242-0 (vol. 2)
- Schuchmann, K.L. (1999). "Swallow-tailed hummingbird". In del Hoyo, J.; Elliott, A.; Sargatal, J. (eds.). Handbook of the Birds of the World. Vol. 5: Barn-owls to Hummingbirds. Barcelona, Spain: Lynx Edicions. p. 554. ISBN 978-84-87334-25-2.
- Schulenberg, T.; Stotz, D.; Lane, D.; O'Neill, J. & Parker, T. III (2007): Birds of Peru. Christopher Helm, London. ISBN 978-0-7136-8673-9
- Sick, Helmut (1993): Birds of Brazil - A Natural History. Princeton University Press, Princeton. ISBN 0-691-08569-2
- Sigrist, T. (2006): Birds of Brazil - An Artistic View. ISBN 85-905074-1-6
- Straube, Fernando Costa; Urben-Filho, Alberto & Piacentini, Vítor de Queiroz (2006): O Beija-flor-tesoura Eupetomena macroura (Gmelin, 1788) e sua ampliação de distribuição pelo Sul do Brasil ["The Swallow-tailed Hummingbird and its distribution expansion in the south of Brazil"]. Atualidades Ornitológicas 132 [In Portuguese]. PDF fulltext Archived 2016-03-03 at the Wayback Machine
