= Proctonemesia =

Scientific classification
- Kingdom: Animalia
- Phylum: Arthropoda
- Subphylum: Chelicerata
- Class: Arachnida
- Order: Araneae
- Infraorder: Araneomorphae
- Family: Salticidae
- Subfamily: Salticinae
- Genus: Proctonemesia; Bauab & Soares, 1978

Type species
- P. multicaudata Bauab & Soares, 1978

Species
- P. multicaudata Bauab & Soares, 1978 – Brazil; P. secunda (Soares & Camargo, 1948) – Brazil

Genus of spiders

Proctonemesia is a genus of Brazilian jumping spiders that was first described by M. J. Bauab V. & B. A. M. Soares in 1978. As of August 2019 it contains only two species, found only in Brazil: P. multicaudata and P. secunda.
