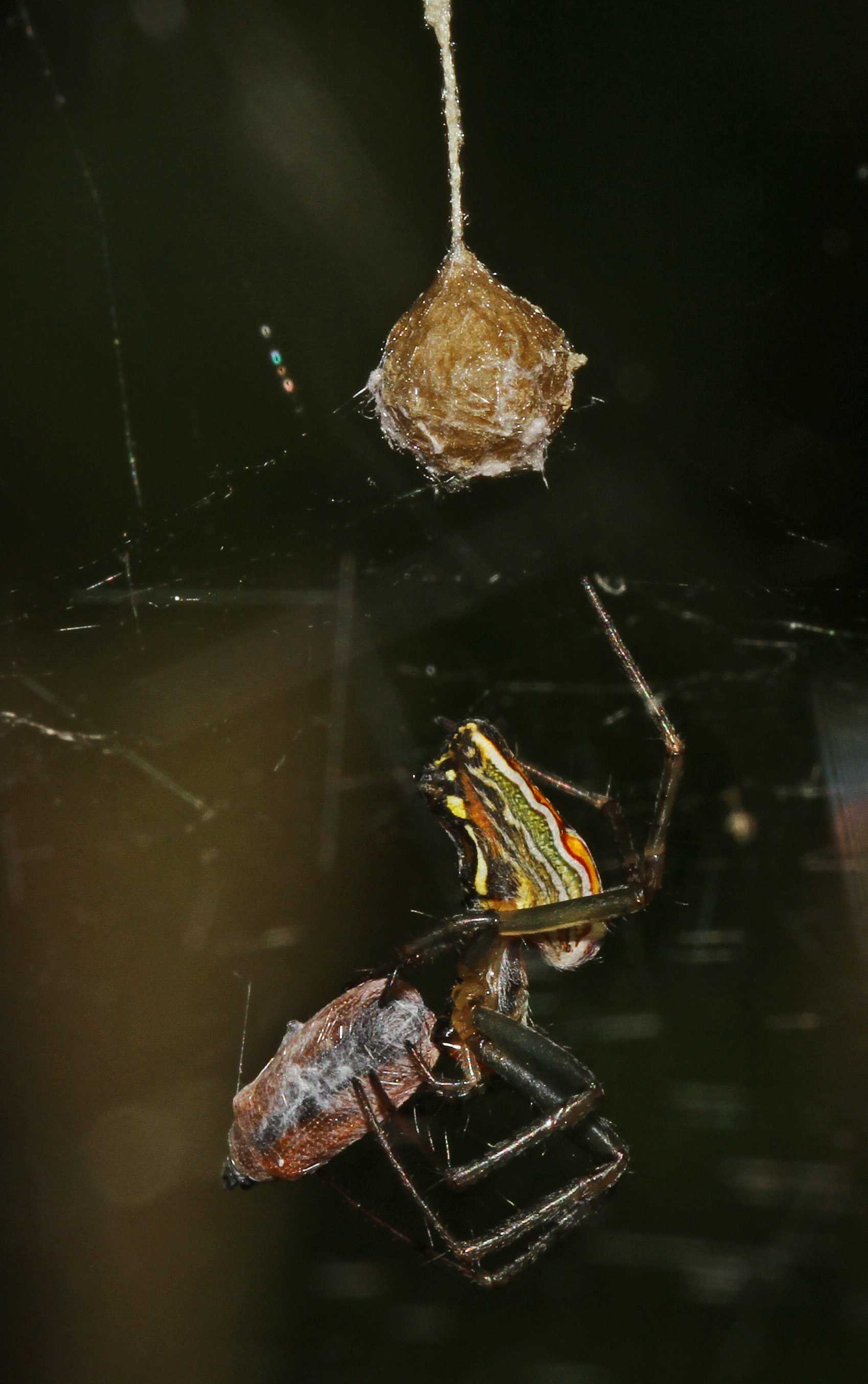
- M. lemniscata

Scientific classification
- Kingdom: Animalia
- Phylum: Arthropoda
- Subphylum: Chelicerata
- Class: Arachnida
- Order: Araneae
- Infraorder: Araneomorphae
- Family: Araneidae
- Genus: Mecynogea; Simon, 1903

Type species
- M. bigibba Simon, 1903

Species
- 9, see text

Synonyms
- Allepeira Banks, 1932

= Mecynogea =

Genus of spiders

Mecynogea is a genus of orb-weaver spiders first described by Eugène Simon in 1903. The name is derived from the Greek mekyno (μηυνω), meaning "to lengthen", and "gea" (γεα), meaning "earth".

== Species ==
As of November 2026 it contains nine species in the Americas:

- Mecynogea apatzingan Levi, 1997 – Mexico
- Mecynogea bigibba Simon, 1903 – Brazil, Uruguay
- Mecynogea buique Levi, 1997 – Brazil
- Mecynogea erythromela (Holmberg, 1876) – Brazil, Paraguay, Argentina, Chile
- Mecynogea infelix (Soares & Camargo, 1948) – Colombia, Brazil
- Mecynogea lemniscata (Walckenaer, 1841) – USA to Argentina
- Mecynogea martiana (Archer, 1958) – Cuba, Hispaniola
- Mecynogea ocosingo Levi, 1997 – Mexico
- Mecynogea sucre Levi, 1997 – Venezuela, Brazil
