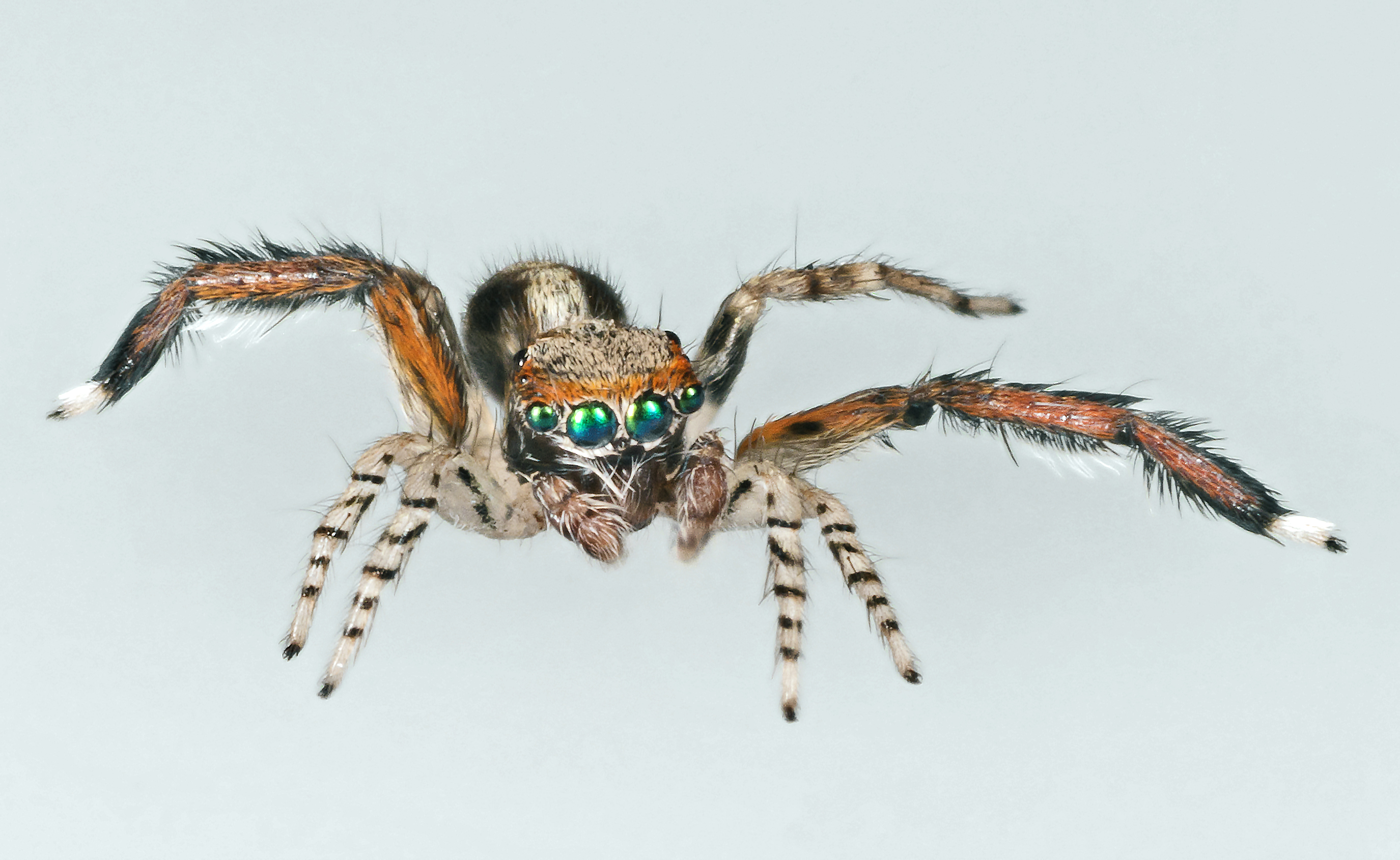
- Saitis barbipes (male)

Scientific classification
- Kingdom: Animalia
- Phylum: Arthropoda
- Subphylum: Chelicerata
- Class: Arachnida
- Order: Araneae
- Infraorder: Araneomorphae
- Family: Salticidae
- Subfamily: Salticinae
- Genus: Saitis; Simon, 1876

Type species
- Euophrys barbipes Canestrini & Pavesi, 1868

Species
- 32, see text

= Saitis =

Genus of spiders

Saitis is a genus of jumping spiders that was first described by Eugène Louis Simon in 1876. The Australian species may belong to other genera, such as Maratus.

== Species ==
As of August 2019 it contains thirty-two species, found worldwide:

- Saitis annae Cockerell, 1894 – Jamaica
- Saitis aranukanus Roewer, 1944 – Kiribati (Gilbert Is.)
- Saitis ariadneae Logunov, 2001 – Greece (Crete)
- Saitis auberti Berland, 1938 – Vanuatu
- Saitis barbipes (Simon, 1868) (type) – Northern Africa, southern Europe to Turkey
- Saitis berlandi Roewer, 1951 – Vanuatu
- Saitis breviusculus Simon, 1901 – Gabon
- Saitis catulus Simon, 1901 – Venezuela
- Saitis chaperi Simon, 1885 – India, Sri Lanka
- Saitis cupidon (Simon, 1885) – New Caledonia
- Saitis cyanipes Simon, 1901 – Brazil
- Saitis graecus Kulczyński, 1905 – Albania, Greece, Bulgaria
- Saitis imitatus (Simon, 1868) – Croatia, Montenegro
- Saitis insectus (Hogg, 1896) – Central Australia
- Saitis insulanus Rainbow, 1920 – Australia (Lord Howe Is.)
- Saitis kandyensis Kim, Ye & Oh, 2013 – Sri Lanka
- Saitis lacustris Hickman, 1944 – Central Australia
- Saitis latifrons Caporiacco, 1928 – Libya
- Saitis magniceps (Keyserling, 1882) – Australia (Queensland)
- Saitis marcusi Soares & Camargo, 1948 – Brazil
- Saitis mutans Otto & Hill, 2012 – Australia (New South Wales)
- Saitis nanus Soares & Camargo, 1948 – Brazil
- Saitis perplexides (Strand, 1908) – Jamaica
- Saitis relucens (Thorell, 1877) – Indonesia (Sulawesi)
- Saitis sengleti (Metzner, 1999) – Greece (incl. Crete)
- Saitis signatus (Keyserling, 1883) – Unknown
- Saitis spinosus (Mello-Leitão, 1945) – Argentina
- Saitis splendidus (Walckenaer, 1837) – Timor
- Saitis taeniatus Keyserling, 1883 – Australia
- Saitis tauricus Kulczyński, 1905 – Italy, Hungary, Macedonia, Bulgaria, Greece, Turkey, Ukraine
- Saitis variegatus Mello-Leitão, 1941 – Argentina
- Saitis virgatus Otto & Hill, 2012 – Australia (New South Wales)
