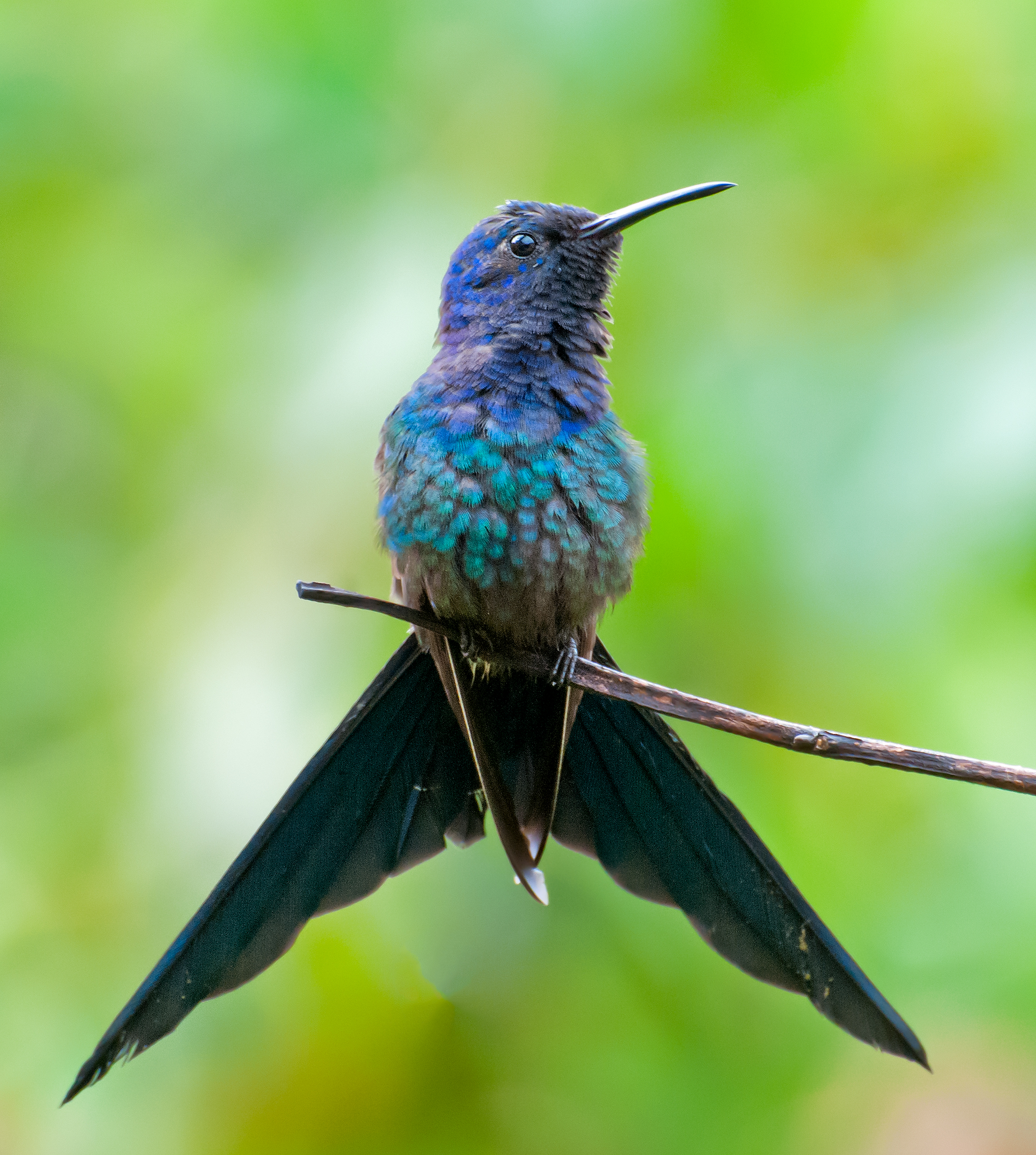
- Swallow-tailed hummingbird, (Eupetomena macroura)

Scientific classification
- Kingdom: Animalia
- Phylum: Chordata
- Class: Aves
- Order: Apodiformes
- Family: Trochilidae
- Tribe: Trochilini
- Genus: Eupetomena; Gould, 1853

Type species
- Trochilus macroura (swallow-tailed hummingbird) Gmelin, JF, 1788

Species
- 2, see text

= Eupetomena =

Genus of birds

Eupetomena is a genus in the hummingbird family Trochilidae. It contains two species which are both found in eastern South America.

== Taxonomy ==
The genus Eupetomena was introduced in 1853 by the English ornithologist John Gould to accommodate a single species, the swallow-tailed hummingbird which therefore becomes the type species. The genus name combines the Ancient Greek eu (εὐ-) meaning "good" and the neuter participle petomena (πετόμενα) meaning "always on the wing" or "flying" (from petomai, πέτομαι, "to fly"). Literally, it can mean "the one that flies well, good flyer" (εὐπετόμενα).

The genus contains two species:

Genus Eupetomena – Gould, 1853 – two species
Common name	Scientific name and subspecies	Range	Size and ecology	IUCN status and estimated population
Swallow-tailed hummingbird	Eupetomena macroura (Gmelin, JF, 1788) Five subspecies: E. m. macroura (Gmelin, JF, 1788); E. m. simoni Hellmayr, 1929; E. m. cyanoviridis Grantsau, 1988; E. m. hirundo Gould, 1875; E. m. boliviana Zimmer, JT, 1950	Guianas, Bolivia, Peru, Brazil, Paraguay and northeast Argentina	Size: Habitat: Diet:	LC
Sombre hummingbird	Eupetomena cirrochloris (Vieillot, 1818)	Brazil	Size: Habitat: Diet:	LC

The sombre hummingbird was formerly placed in the genus Aphantochroa but based primarily on a molecular phylogenetic study published in 2014, Aphantochroa has been merged into Eupetomena.
