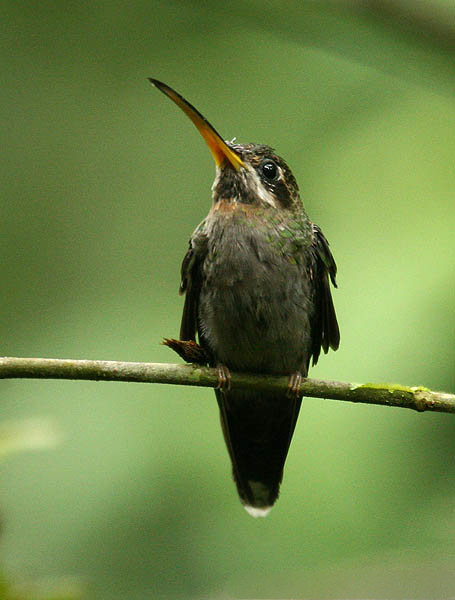
- Band-tailed barbthroat, Threnetes ruckeri

Scientific classification
- Domain: Eukaryota
- Kingdom: Animalia
- Phylum: Chordata
- Class: Aves
- Clade: Strisores
- Order: Apodiformes
- Family: Trochilidae
- Subfamily: Phaethornithinae
- Genus: Threnetes; Gould, 1852

Type species
- Trochilus leucurus Linnaeus, 1766

Species
- See text

= Barbthroat =

Barbthroats

Genus of birds

The barbthroats are a genus Threnetes of South American hummingbirds in the family Trochilidae.

== Taxonomy ==
The genus Threnetes was introduced in 1852 by the English ornithologist John Gould. The name is from the Ancient Greek thrēnētēs meaning "mourner". The type species is the pale-tailed barbthroat. The genus contains three species.

Genus Threnetes – Gould, 1852 – three species
Common name	Scientific name and subspecies	Range	Size and ecology	IUCN status and estimated population
Pale-tailed barbthroat	Threnetes leucurus (Linnaeus, 1766) Four subspecies: T. l. cervinicauda Gould, 1855; T. l. rufigastra Cory, 1915; T. l. leucurus (Linnaeus, 1766); T. l. medianus Hellmayr, 1929	Brazil, Bolivia, Colombia, Ecuador, Peru, French Guiana, Guyana, Suriname, and Venezuela	Size: Habitat: Diet:	LC
Sooty barbthroat	Threnetes niger (Linnaeus, 1758) Two subspecies: T. n. niger (Linnaeus, 1758); T. n. loehkeni Grantsau, 1969	French Guiana	Size: Habitat: Diet:	LC
Band-tailed barbthroat	Threnetes ruckeri (Bourcier, 1847) Three subspecies: T. r. ruckeri (Bourcier, 1847); T. r. venezuelensis Cory, 1913; T. r. ventosus Bangs & T. E. Penard, 1924	from southeastern Guatemala and Belize to western Ecuador and western Venezuela	Size: Habitat: Diet:	LC

The supposed "black barbthroats", described as T. grzimeki, are actually juvenile males of the rufous-breasted hermit (Glaucis hirsuta).
