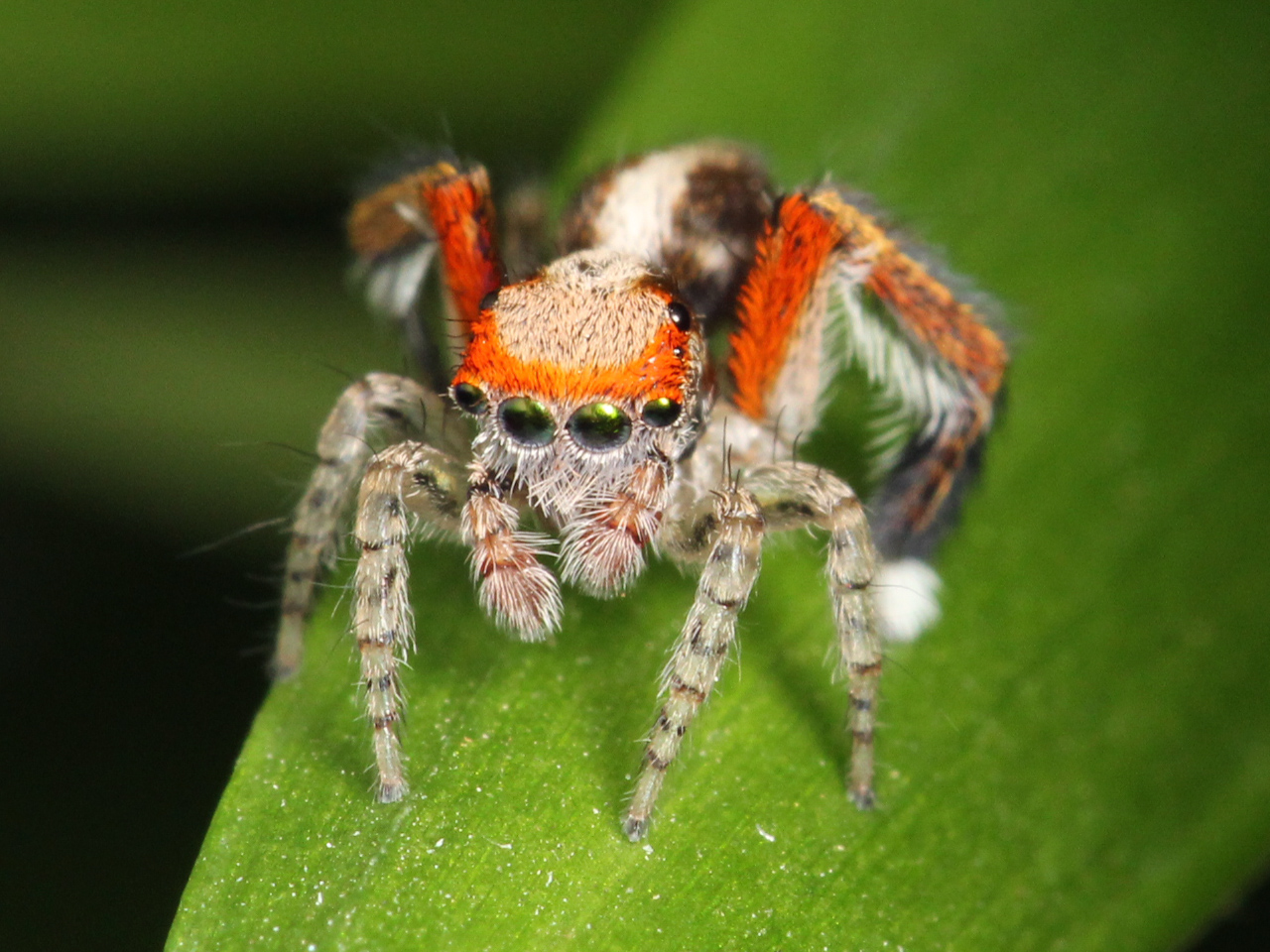
- Male from Barcelona, Spain
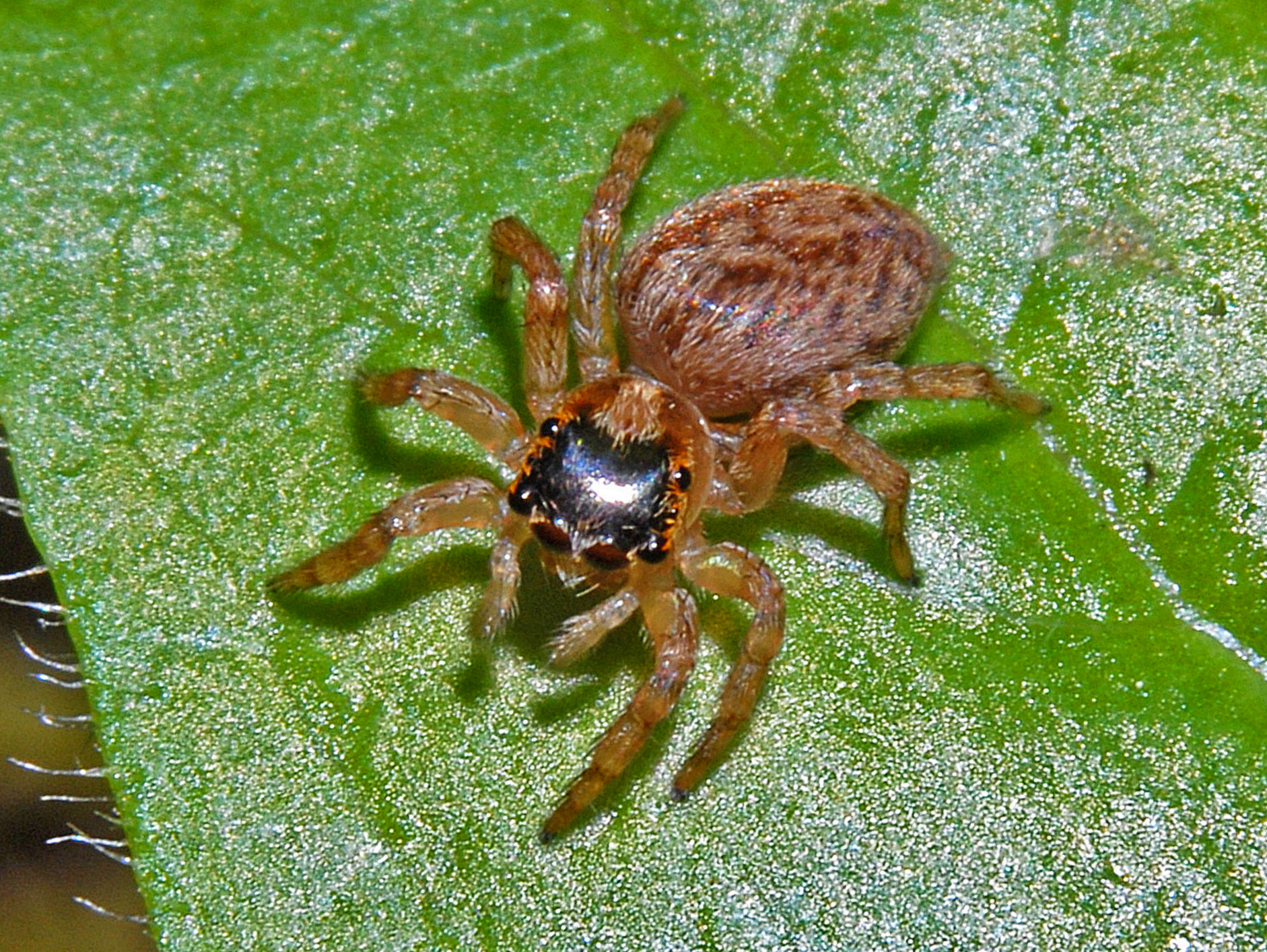
- Female

Scientific classification
- Kingdom: Animalia
- Phylum: Arthropoda
- Subphylum: Chelicerata
- Class: Arachnida
- Order: Araneae
- Infraorder: Araneomorphae
- Family: Salticidae
- Genus: Saitis
- Species: S. barbipes

Binomial name
- Saitis barbipes (Simon, 1868)

Synonyms
- Attus barbipes Simon, 1868; Euophrys barbipes (Simon, 1868); Attus scriptus Simon, 1868; Salticus blandus Blackwall, 1870; Saitis sanctae-eufemiae Kolosváry, 1938

= Saitis barbipes =

Species of spider

Saitis barbipes is a common jumping spider (family Salticidae) found in the Mediterranean region.

== Etymology ==
The species name barbipes is derived from Latin, and means "bearded foot".

== Taxonomy ==
The species Saitis barbipes was described by the French naturalist Eugène Simon in 1868, under the name of Attus barbipes. It was placed in 1876 by Eugène Simon in the genus Saitis of which it constitutes the type species.

The Australian "peacock spider", Maratus volans, has a range of superficial similarities to the species, such as green eyes, and an enlarged third pair of legs used for courtship. Recent work suggests that Saitis and Maratus are closely related genera.

== Distribution ==
This species is present in the Mediterranean region, from southern Europe (Bulgaria, France, Germany, Greece, Italy, Netherlands, North Macedonia, Portugal, Spain and Switzerland) to Turkey and in North Africa.

== Habitat ==
These jumping spiders can be found on houses and rocks, as well as indoors.

== Description ==
Saitis barbipes is characterized by a significant Sexual dimorphism. Males can reach a body length of 3.8–4 millimetres (0.15–0.16 in), while females measure 4.6–5.7 millimetres (0.18–0.22 in). The female shows a less evident coloration, with a dull brown body, a dark or blackish eyes field and pale brown legs with almost no drawing.

On the contrary the smaller male is strikingly colored, especially when frontally viewed. It has bright emerald green eyes, the four white frontal legs are densely haired and regularly interspersed by black stripes and there is a red band above the eyes, which extends on the sides to the rear pair of eyes. The cephalothorax (prosoma) usually is pale brown and rather hairy above the eyes. The abdomen (opisthosoma) is provided on the upper side with a laterally dark bordered longitudinal band. Saitis barbipes is probably the most colorful species of jumping spiders in Europe. The most impressive feature however is the greatly enlarged third pair of legs. These are longer and colored red near the body, fading into black, with white tufts at the end.

== Behavior ==
Thanks to the long third pair of legs these spiders can jump at great distances. These legs are also used in courtship display. When the male spots a female, he raises vertically the third pair of legs. As he approaches her, from time to time he audibly vibrates them. A receptive female will then collapse on her legs and turn her abdomen ventral side upward. Sexually mature animals can be found year-round.

== Gallery ==
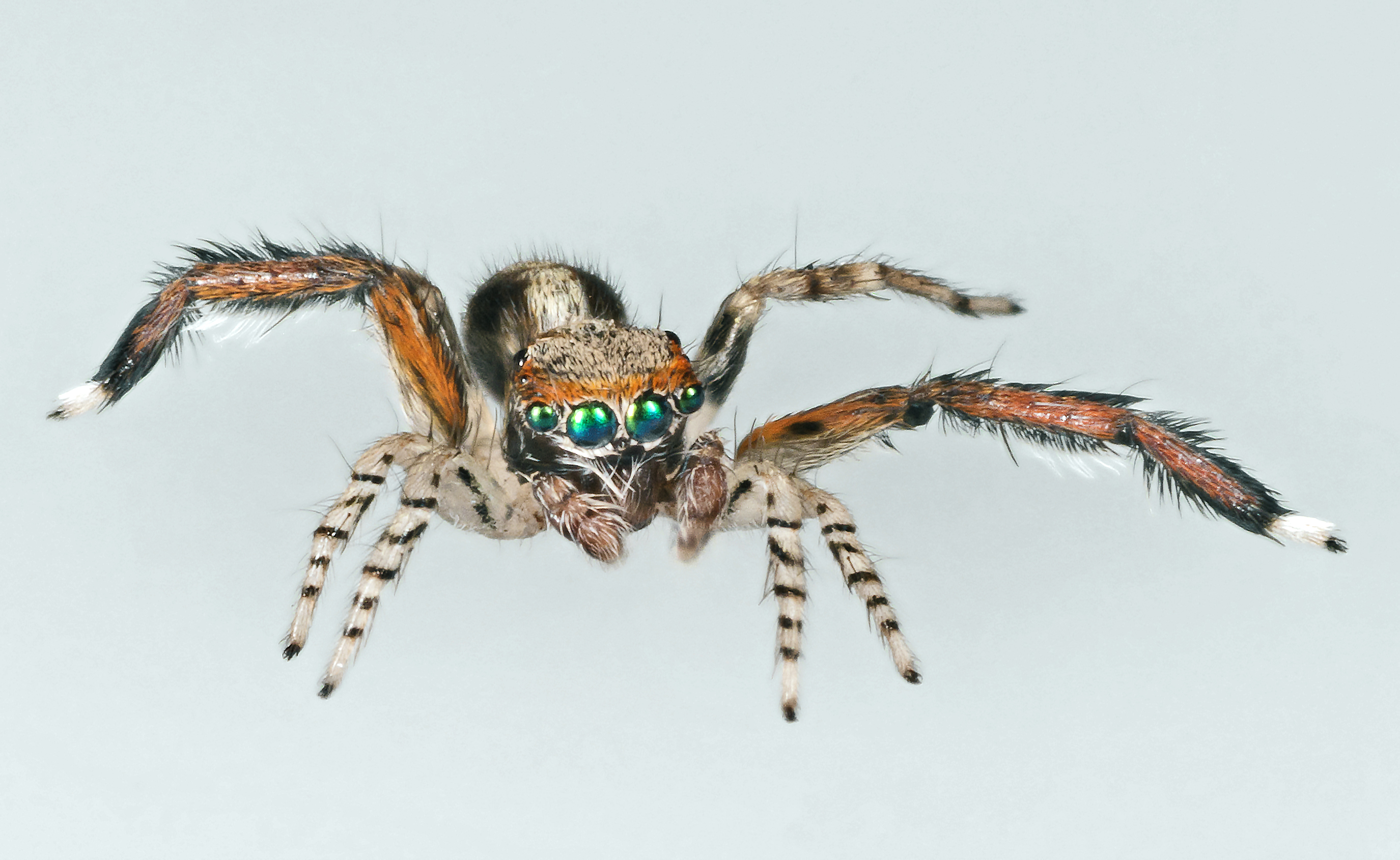
Male, front view

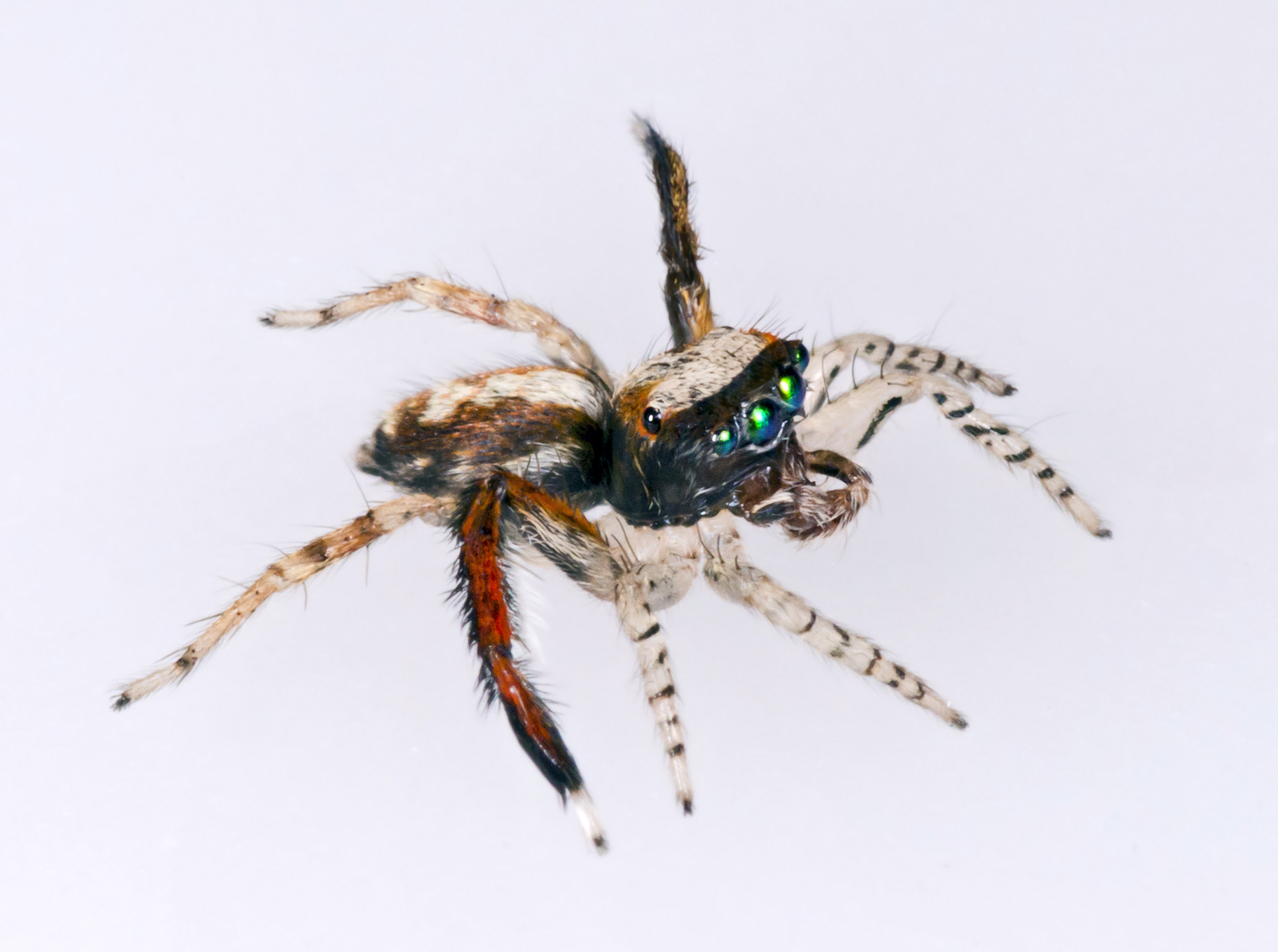
Male, side view

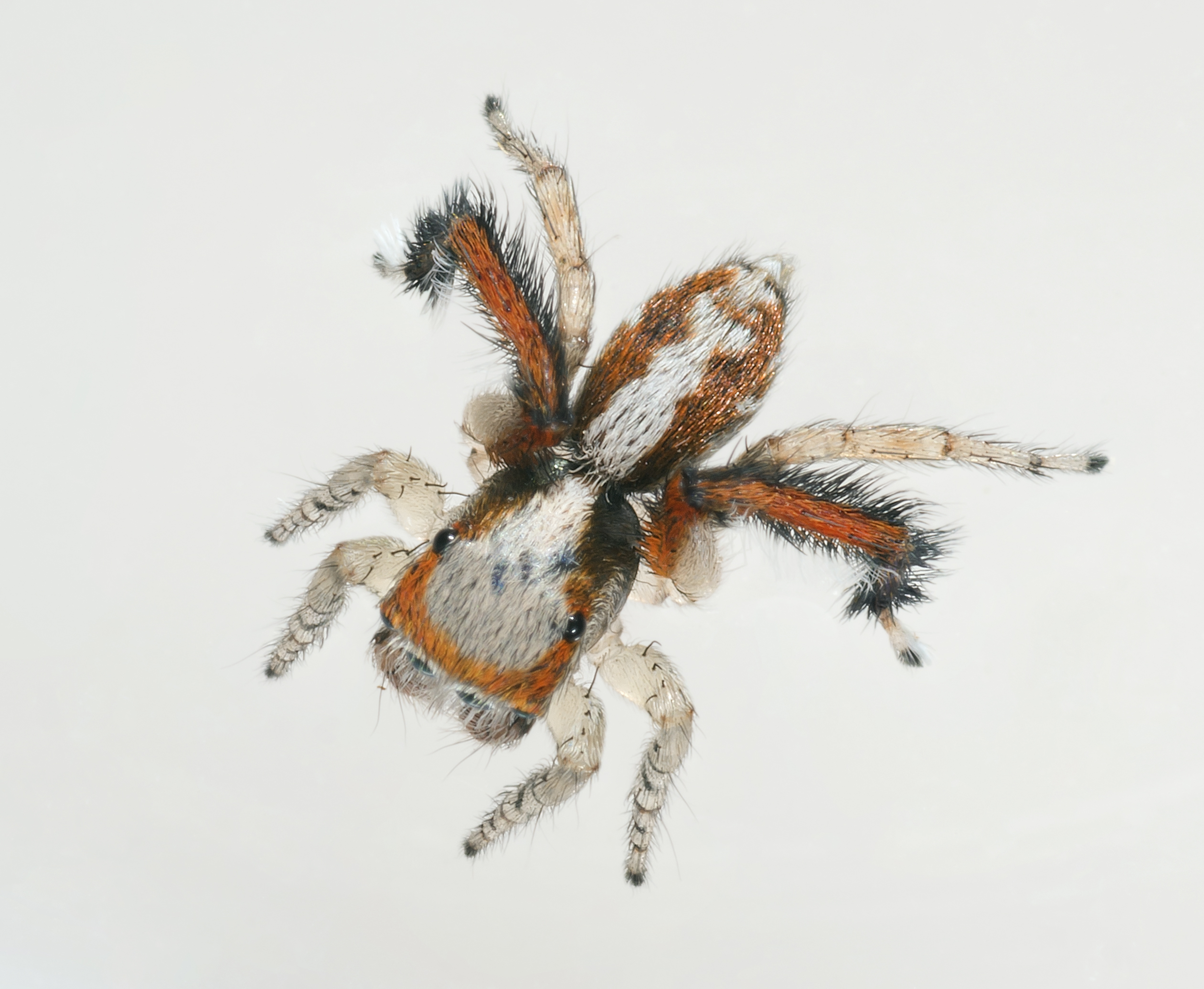
Male, top view

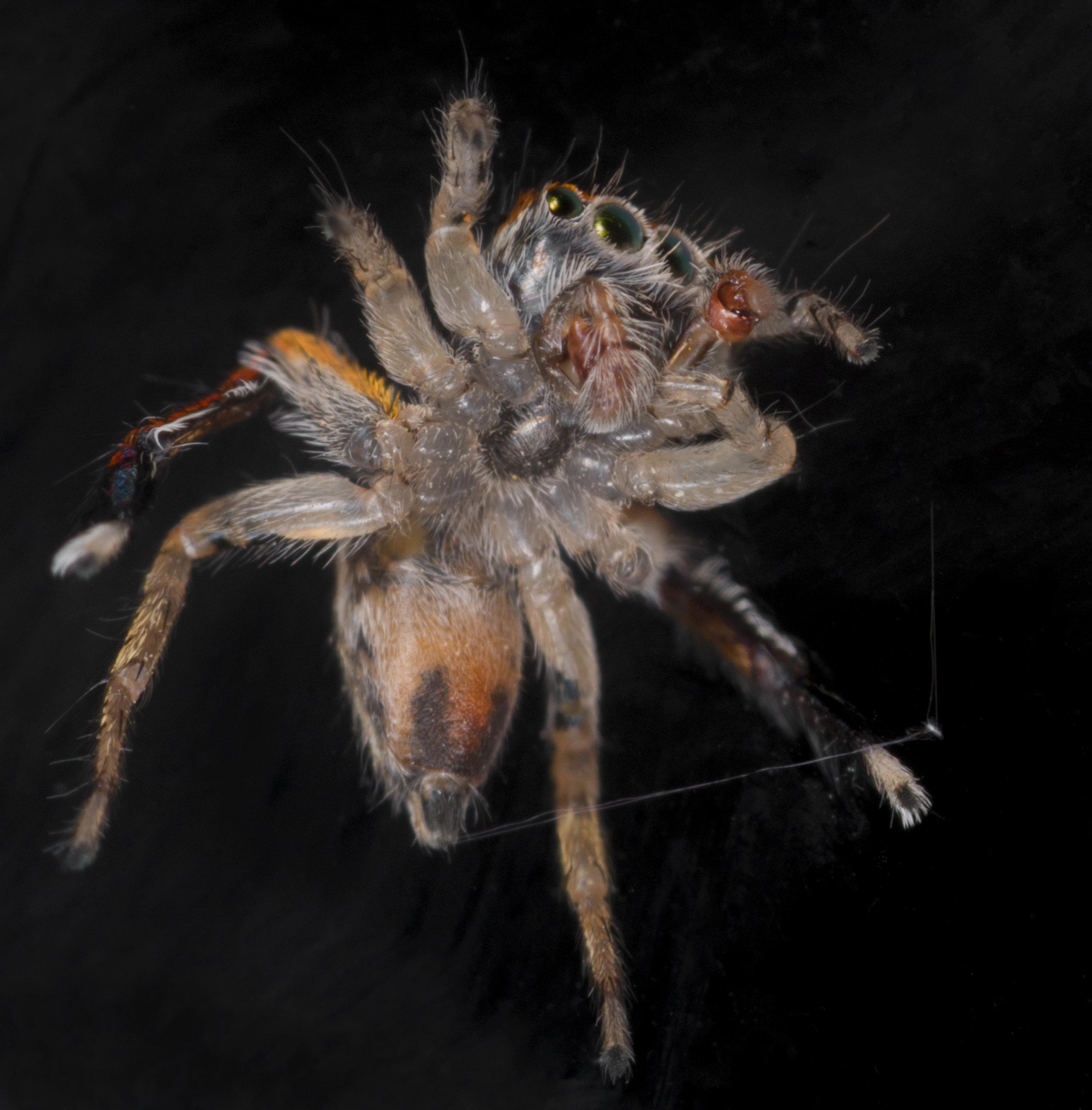
Male, bottom view

== Bibliography ==
- Blagoev G., Deltshev C.D., Lazarov S. (2002) The Spiders (Araneae) of Bulgaria
- Blick, Bosmans R., Buchar J., Gajdoa P., Hänggi A., Helsdingen P. Van , Rulicka V., Starega W., Thaler K. (2004) Checklist of the spiders of Central Europe
- Flanczewska E. (1981) Remarks on Salticidae (Aranei) of Bulgaria, Annales Zoologici, Warszawa: 221
- Fuhn I. E., Gherasim V. (1995) Familia Salticidae. Fauna Romaniei, Arachnida, Acad. Roman., Bucuresti: 107,
- Hansen H. (1986) Die Salticidae der coll. Canestrini (Arachnida: Araneae), Boll. Soc. veneziana Stor. nat.: 112
- Kulczynski W. (1905a) Araneae nonnullae in insulis Maderianis collectae a Rev. E. Schmitz, - Bulletin international de l'Académie des sciences de Cracovie (sci. mathématiques et naturelles), Kraków
- Logunov D.V. (2004b) Notes on the collection of Salticidae (Araneae) from the Museum of Natural History 'Enrico Gaffi' in Bergamo, Italy, Revista Ibérica de Aracnología: p. 274, illustrations 5-6
- Pesarini C. (1997) I ragni (Arachnida Araneae) del Monte Barro (Italia, Lombardia, Lecco), Mem. Soc. ital. Sci. nat. Museo civ. Stor. nat. Milano
- Prószynski J. (2003b) Salticidae (Aranae) of the World. Ver. 1995-2006
- Simon E. (1876) Les Arachnides de France. Tome 3., 169
- Simon E. (1901a) Histoire Naturelle des Araignees
- Simon E. (1937) Les Arachnides de France. Tome VI.
- Trotta A. (2005) Introduzione ai Ragni italiani (Arachnida Araneae), Memorie della Societa entomologica italiana, Genova
