= Saitis chaperi =

Scientific classification
- Kingdom: Animalia
- Phylum: Arthropoda
- Subphylum: Chelicerata
- Class: Arachnida
- Order: Araneae
- Infraorder: Araneomorphae
- Family: Salticidae
- Genus: Saitis
- Species: S. chaperi

Binomial name
- Saitis chaperi Simon, 1885

Species of spider

Saitis chaperi is a species of spider of the genus Saitis. It is native to India and Sri Lanka.
