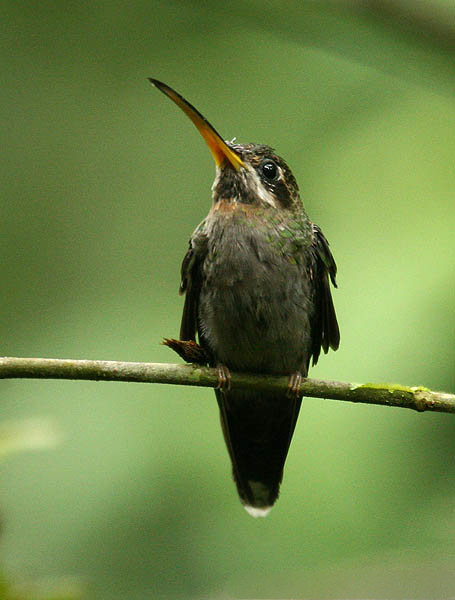

Conservation status
- Least Concern (IUCN 3.1)
- CITES Appendix II

Scientific classification
- Kingdom: Animalia
- Phylum: Chordata
- Class: Aves
- Clade: Strisores
- Order: Apodiformes
- Family: Trochilidae
- Genus: Threnetes
- Species: T. ruckeri

Binomial name
- Threnetes ruckeri (Bourcier, 1847)

Subspecies
- T. r. ruckeri (Bourcier, 1847); T. r. venezuelensis Cory, 1913; T. r. ventosus Bangs & T. E. Penard, 1924

Audio

= Band-tailed barbthroat =

Species of hummingbird

The band-tailed barbthroat (Threnetes ruckeri) is a medium-sized hummingbird that is found from southeastern Guatemala and Belize to western Ecuador and western Venezuela.

== Taxonomy and systematics ==
The band-tailed barbthroat has the three subspecies listed. A fourth proposed subspecies, T. r. darienensis of the Panama-Colombia border area, shares the characteristics of all three recognized subspecies. The band-tailed barbthroat and the other two members of its genus pale-tailed barbthroat (T. lecurus) and sooty barbthroat (T. niger) form a superspecies.

== Description ==
The band-tailed barbthroat is 10 to 11 cm (3.9 to 4.3 in) long. Males weigh 5.5 to 7 g (0.19 to 0.25 oz) and females 5 to 7 g (0.18 to 0.25 oz).The adult male of the nominate subspecies has bronze-green upperparts, a dark ear patch and chin, and a dusky malar stripe. The tail is dark with white bases and tips to the feathers that create a black band near the end. The throat is ochraceous and the underparts are otherwise gray with some green feathers. It has a nearly straight bill. As with other hermit hummingbirds, the sexes are similar; the female's bill is somewhat more decurved than the male's and the plumage has less contrast among the throat, breast, and belly. Young birds resemble the adult but have ochraceous feather edges. T. r. venezuelensis has a somewhat larger ochraceous throat patch than the nominate. T. r. ventosus has a much larger and bright orange throat patch and an ochraceous tinge to the belly.

== Distribution and habitat ==
T. r. ventosus is the northernmost subspecies of band-tailed barbthroat. It is found from eastern Guatemala and Belize through Honduras, Nicaragua, and Costa Rica into Panama. The nominate T. r. ruckeri is found from northern and western Colombia south through western Ecuador almost to Peru. T. r. venezuelensis is found in northwestern Venezuela. The species inhabits the understory and edges of primary forest and old second growth, and also semi-open shrublands, thickets, and plantations. In elevation it ranges from sea level to 1,200 m (3,900 ft).

== Behavior ==
=== Movement ===
The band-tailed barbthroat is presumed to be sedentary. However, some movement has been noted after the breeding season, especially among young birds.

=== Feeding ===
Like other hermit hummingbirds, the band-tailed barbthroat is a "trap-line" feeder, visiting a circuit of flowering plants. It feeds on nectar at Heliconia and other tubular flowers and also on small arthropods, especially spiders. In addition to probing flowers for nectar, it also "robs" by piercing the base of the tube.

=== Breeding ===
The band-tailed barbthroat's nesting season varies widely across its range. Its nest is a cup of plant and other fibers and cobweb attached to the underside tip of a long drooping leaf. The female alone incubates the two white eggs, though males have been observed remaining in the nest's vicinity.

=== Vocalization ===
The band-tailed barbthroat's song is "a fast high-pitched phrase of some 5–10 notes repeated with intervals of several seconds...e.g. 'tzi-tzi-tsee-ee-tsi-tzi-tzi'." In Costa Rica the Pacific slope population has a more complex song than that of the Caribbean slope birds; it includes trills.

== Status ==
The IUCN has assessed the band-tailed barbthroat as being of Least Concern, although its population has not been enumerated and its trend is not known. It appears to be generally common and occurs is several protected areas.
