= Saitis insectus =

Scientific classification
- Kingdom: Animalia
- Phylum: Arthropoda
- Subphylum: Chelicerata
- Class: Arachnida
- Order: Araneae
- Infraorder: Araneomorphae
- Family: Salticidae
- Genus: Saitis
- Species: S. insectus

Binomial name
- Saitis insectus Hogg, 1896

Synonyms
- Prostheclina insecta Hogg, 1896

Species of spider

Saitis insectus is a species of spider in the genus Saitis and the family, Salticidae. It is found in central Australia.

== Taxonomy ==
Map

Saitis insectus was first described in 1896 by Henry Roughton Hogg as Prostheclina insecta It was transferred to the genus, Saitis in 1911 by William Joseph Rainbow (as Saitis insecta). Hogg' describes a female spider, (K946) collected from Rudall's Creek in the Northern Territory in 1894.
