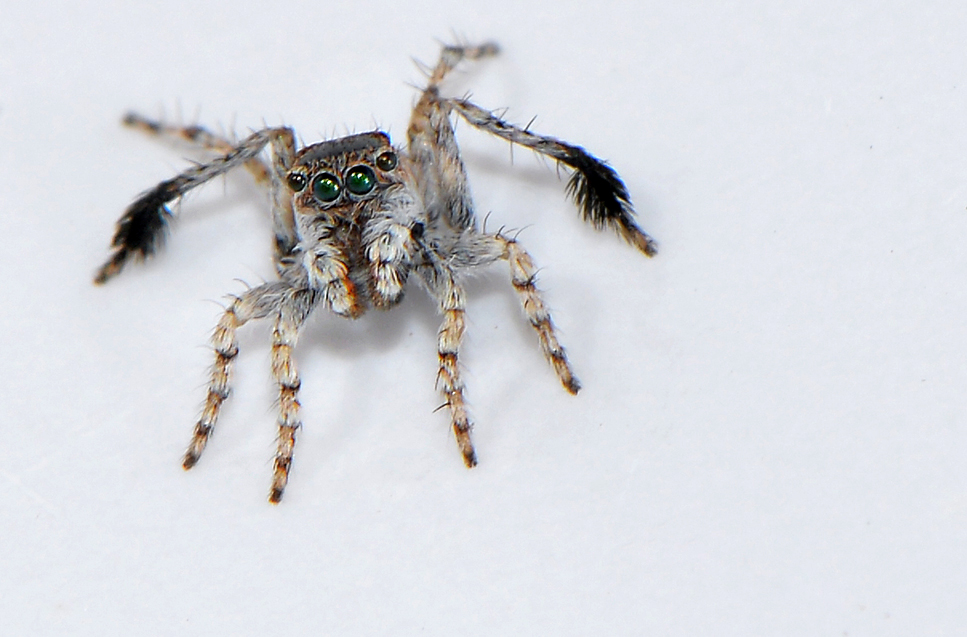
- Saitis mutans (male)
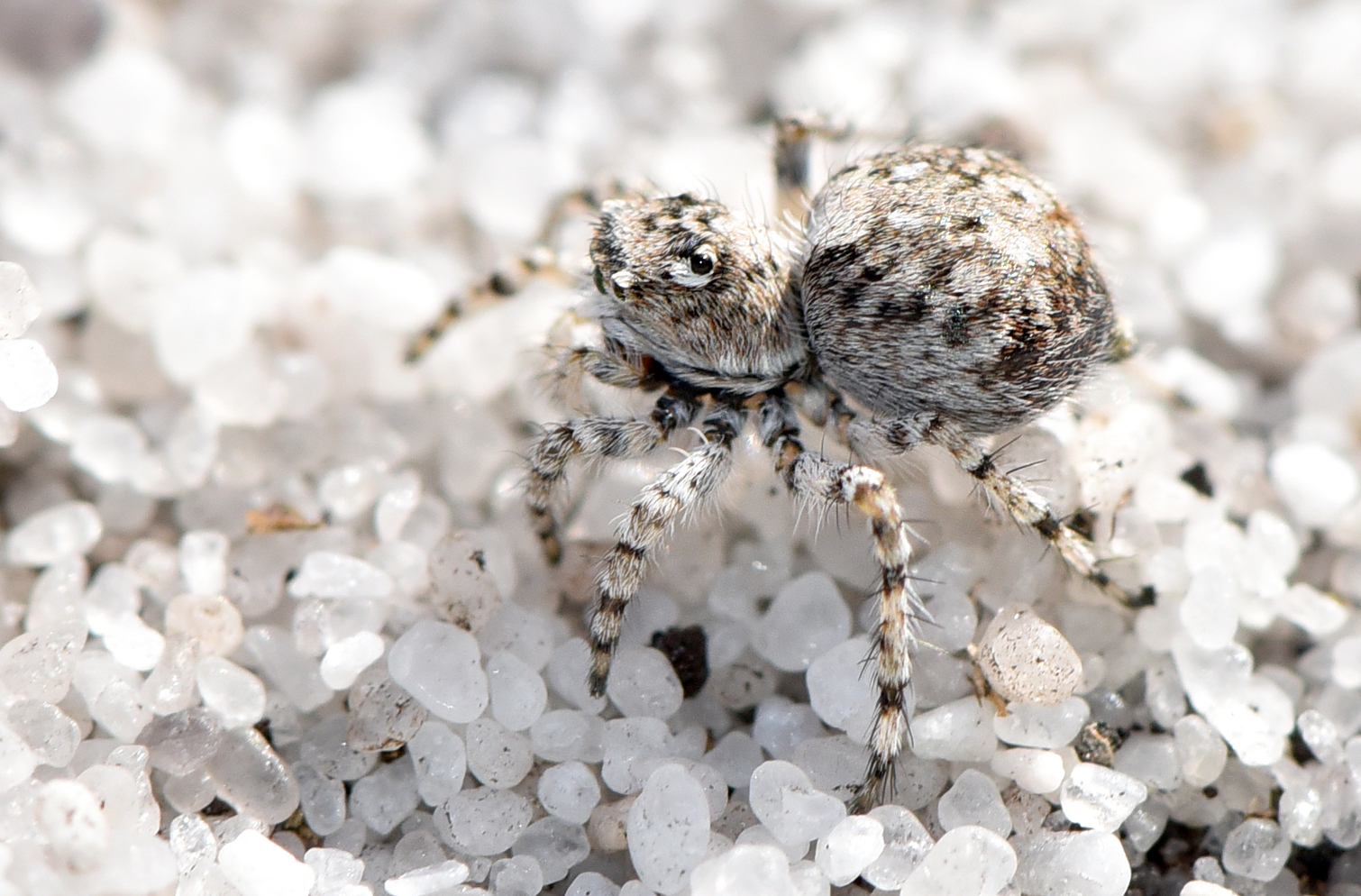
- Saitis mutans (female)

Scientific classification
- Kingdom: Animalia
- Phylum: Arthropoda
- Subphylum: Chelicerata
- Class: Arachnida
- Order: Araneae
- Infraorder: Araneomorphae
- Family: Salticidae
- Genus: Saitis
- Species: S. mutans

Binomial name
- Saitis mutans Otto & Hill, 2012

= Saitis mutans =

Species of spider

Saitis mutans is a species of spider in the genus Saitis. It is endemic to Australia.

The male spiders vary in length from 3.35 to 3.72 mm, while the females are slightly longer (3.72 to 4.12 mm). When courting, the male uses simple semaphoring movements of his extended third pair of legs.

== Etymology ==
The species epithet, mutans, is Latin for "changing", and refers to the fact that the females are highly variable in appearance.
