= Saitis annae =

Scientific classification
- Kingdom: Animalia
- Phylum: Arthropoda
- Subphylum: Chelicerata
- Class: Arachnida
- Order: Araneae
- Infraorder: Araneomorphae
- Family: Salticidae
- Genus: Saitis
- Species: S. annae

Binomial name
- Saitis annae Cockerell, 1894

Species of spider

Saitis annae is a species of jumping spider in the family Salticidae.

It found in the Caribbean−West Indies, including on Jamaica.

== See also ==
- Spiders of the Caribbean
