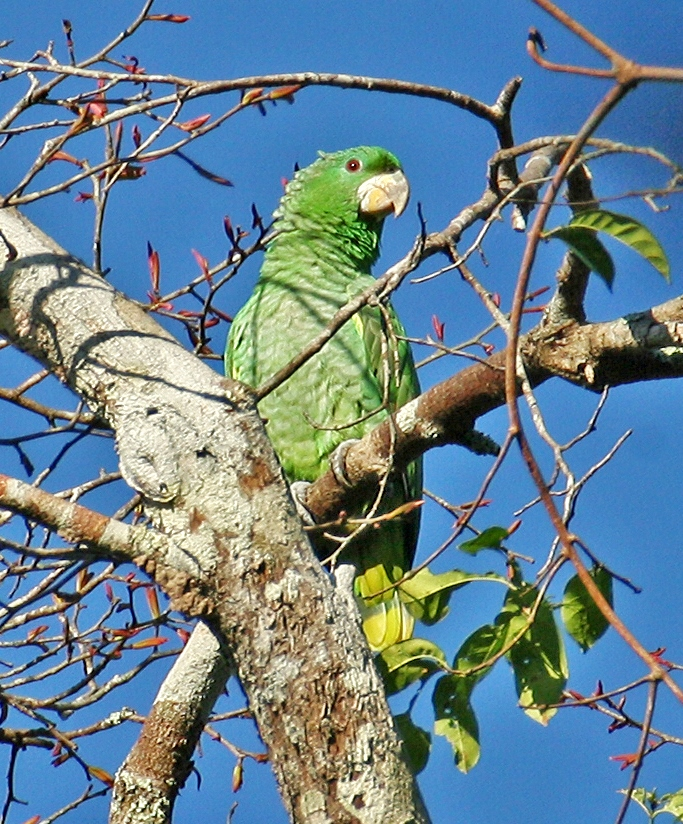
- At Rio Cristalino, Mato Grosso, Brazil

Conservation status
- Least Concern (IUCN 3.1)

Scientific classification
- Kingdom: Animalia
- Phylum: Chordata
- Class: Aves
- Order: Psittaciformes
- Family: Psittacidae
- Genus: Amazona
- Species: A. kawalli

Binomial name
- Amazona kawalli Grantsau & Camargo, 1989

= Kawall's amazon =

Species of bird in Brazil

Kawall's amazon (Amazona kawalli), also known as the white-faced amazon, white-cheeked amazon or Kawall's parrot, is a relatively large species of parrot in the family Psittacidae. It is endemic to the south-central Amazon. After not having been recorded in the wild for around 70 years, the species was rediscovered in the 1980s.

== Taxonomy ==
Considerable taxonomic confusion has surrounded this species. "Aberrant mealy amazons", which actually were Kawall's amazon, were first noted in 1904. It was only in 1989 that the Kawall's amazon was recognised as a species after Brazilian bird keeper Nelson Kawall (after whom the species is named) received a few unusual amazons.

== Description ==
The species is medium-sized for a parrot, reaching a length of 35–36 cm (13.8–14.2 in). The plumage is mostly green, with a narrow white strip at the base of the bill, narrow white eye-ring, and some blue and red present on the outermost flight feathers. Although it resembles the mealy amazon, Kawall's amazon can easily be recognised by its white patch of skin at the base of the bill, relatively small gray ocular ring (may fade to white in captivity), red near the base of the tail, overall brighter green hue and voice.

== Distribution and habitat ==
Kawall's amazon has been reported from the Amazon basin of Brazil in Amazonas and Pará. A possible wider distribution, or the existence of isolated populations, is suggested by the existence of a previously misidentified specimen labelled 'Colombia', and a captive bird found on the edge of Amazonas National Park.

The species inhabits lowland rainforest and shows a preference for permanently flooded woodlands and riverine forest edges.

== Ecology ==
Kawall's amazon has been observed feeding on tree seeds, palm fruits, flowers, and young leaves. It nests in tree cavities, and while it may search out suitable nesting cavities in the dry season, appears to restrict the actual nesting to periods when the forest is flooded.

== Status ==
Although Kawall's amazon was only rediscovered in the wild relatively recently, it appears to be locally fairly common; however populations are declining due to habitat loss from deforestation. A certain amount of capture for the parrot trade also seems present. The species is currently classified as least concern by the IUCN.
