= Saitis kandyensis =

Scientific classification
- Kingdom: Animalia
- Phylum: Arthropoda
- Subphylum: Chelicerata
- Class: Arachnida
- Order: Araneae
- Infraorder: Araneomorphae
- Family: Salticidae
- Genus: Saitis
- Species: S. kandyensis

Binomial name
- Saitis kandyensis Kim, Ye & Oh, 2013

Species of spider

Saitis kandyensis is a species of spider of the genus Saitis. It is endemic to Sri Lanka.
