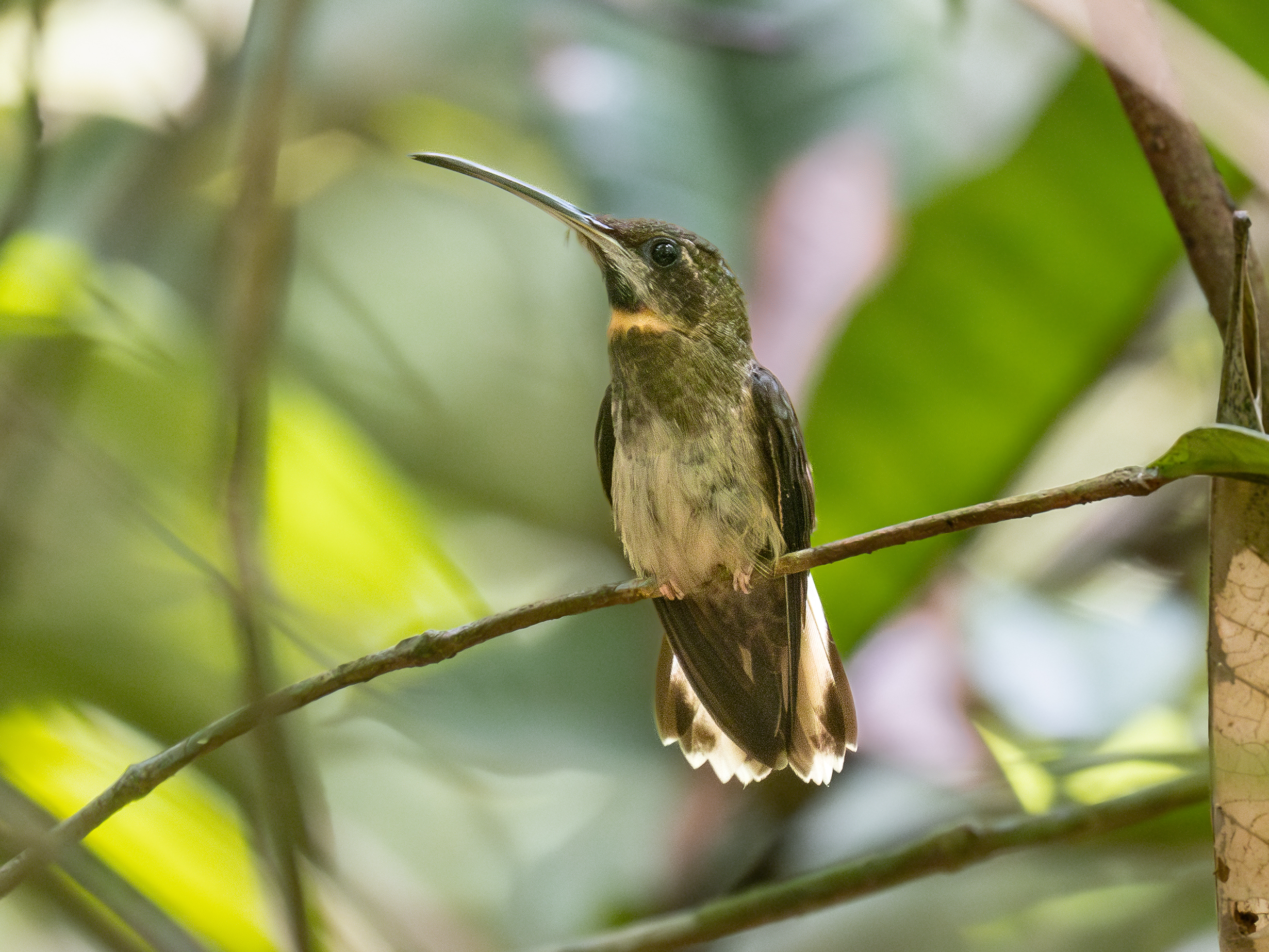

Conservation status
- Least Concern (IUCN 3.1)
- CITES Appendix II

Scientific classification
- Kingdom: Animalia
- Phylum: Chordata
- Class: Aves
- Clade: Strisores
- Order: Apodiformes
- Family: Trochilidae
- Genus: Threnetes
- Species: T. leucurus

Binomial name
- Threnetes leucurus (Linnaeus, 1766)

Synonyms
- Trochilus leucurus Linnaeus, 1766; Threnetes hauxwelli (Note: after the zoological collector John Hauxwell) Boucard, 1895

= Pale-tailed barbthroat =

Species of hummingbird

The pale-tailed barbthroat (Threnetes leucurus) is a species of hummingbird in the family Trochilidae. It is found throughout much of the Amazon Basin from the eastern Andean foothills to the Atlantic Ocean.

== Taxonomy and systematics ==
The pale-tailed barbthroat was formally described by the Swedish naturalist Carl Linnaeus in 1766 in the twelfth edition of his Systema Naturae under the binomial name Trochilus leucurus. Linnaeus based his short description on the "white-tailed humming-bird" that had been described and illustrated by the English naturalist George Edwards in 1758. The type locality is Suriname. The specific epithet is from the Ancient Greek leukouros meaning "white-tailed". The pale-tailed barbthroat is now placed in the genus Threnetes that was introduced in 1852 by the English ornithologist John Gould.

Four subspecies are recognised:

- T. l. cervinicauda Gould, 1855
- T. l. rufigastra Cory, 1915
- T. l. leucurus (Linnaeus, 1766)
- T. l. medianus Hellmayr, 1929

The taxonomy of the pale-tailed and sooty barbthroat (T. niger) complex is unsettled. The two were originally described as separate species, then combined under the name pale-tailed barbthroat but with the binomial T. niger, which had priority. In the early 2000s they were again split, with the two species recognized by the International Ornithological Committee (IOC), the Clements taxonomy, and BirdLife International's Handbook of the Birds of the World (HBW). However, the assignment of subspecies between them varies. The IOC and Clements assign the above four subspecies to the pale-tailed barbthroat and two others to the sooty barbthroat. HBW transfers subspecies loehkeni from the sooty to the pale-tailed, leaving the former monotypic. Other authors suggest that loehkeni should be treated as a separate species.

The pale-tailed barbthroat and the other two members of its genus, band-tailed barbthroat (T. ruckeri) and sooty barbthroat (T. niger), form a superspecies.

== Description ==
The pale-tailed barbthroat is 10 to 12.2 cm (3.9 to 4.8 in) long. Males weigh 4 to 7 g (0.14 to 0.25 oz) and females 4 to 6.5 g (0.14 to 0.23 oz). The adult male has bronze-green upperparts and breast, a dark ear patch and throat with a reddish patch below the later, and a pale malar stripe. The tail is dark with various shades and extent of color on the outer feathers. The belly is gray with ochre tints. It has a nearly straight bill. As with other hermit hummingbirds, the sexes are similar; the female's bill is somewhat more decurved than the male's and the plumage has less contrast among the throat, breast, and belly. Young birds resemble the adult but have ochraceous feather edges. The subspecies differ somewhat in the tail and belly coloration, and there are intergrades between cervinicauda and rufigastra and between rufigastra and leucurus.

== Distribution and habitat ==
The subspecies of pale-tailed barbthroat are distributed thus:

- T. l. cervinicauda, eastern Colombia south through eastern Ecuador into northeastern Peru and east into western Amazonian Brazil
- T. l. rufigastra, eastern Peru south of the Marañón River to northern Bolivia
- T. l. leucurus, southern and eastern Venezuela through Guyana, Suriname, and Amazonian Brazil to northeastern Bolivia (but not confirmed in French Guiana)
- T. l. medianus, northeastern Amazonian Brazil south of the Amazon

The pale-tailed barbthroat inhabits open and semi-open spaces within humid lowland and higher tropical forest, and other landscapes such as gallery forest, várzea and igapó swamp forests, and plantations. It is found from sea level to 850 m (2,790 ft) in Venezuela, in Peru mainly to 1,200 m (3,900 ft) but as high as 1,800 m (5,900 ft), and in Ecuador mainly to 1,100 m (3,600 ft) and as high as 1,600 m (5,200 ft).

== Behavior ==
=== Movement ===
The pale-tailed barbthroat is presumed to be a year round resident throughout its range.

=== Feeding ===
Like other hermit hummingbirds, the pale-tailed barbthroat is a "trap-line" feeder, visiting a circuit of flowering plants. It feeds on nectar at Heliconia and several other tubular flowers and also on small arthropods.

=== Breeding ===
The pale-tailed barbthroat's nesting season varies widely across its range. Its nest is a cone-shaped cup of plant and other fibers and cobweb, covered with lichens, and attached to the underside tip of a long drooping leaf such as a palm frond. The female alone incubates the white eggs.

=== Vocalization ===
The pale-tailed barbthroat's song is "a fast high-pitched phrase of 5–10 notes repeated at intervals of several seconds". Its call is "a high-pitched sharp 'tseet', sometimes doubled."

== Status ==
The IUCN has assessed the pale-tailed barbthroat as being of Least Concern. It has a very large range, and though its population has not been quantified it is believed to be stable. It is considered local and uncommon throughout its range and occurs in several protected areas.
