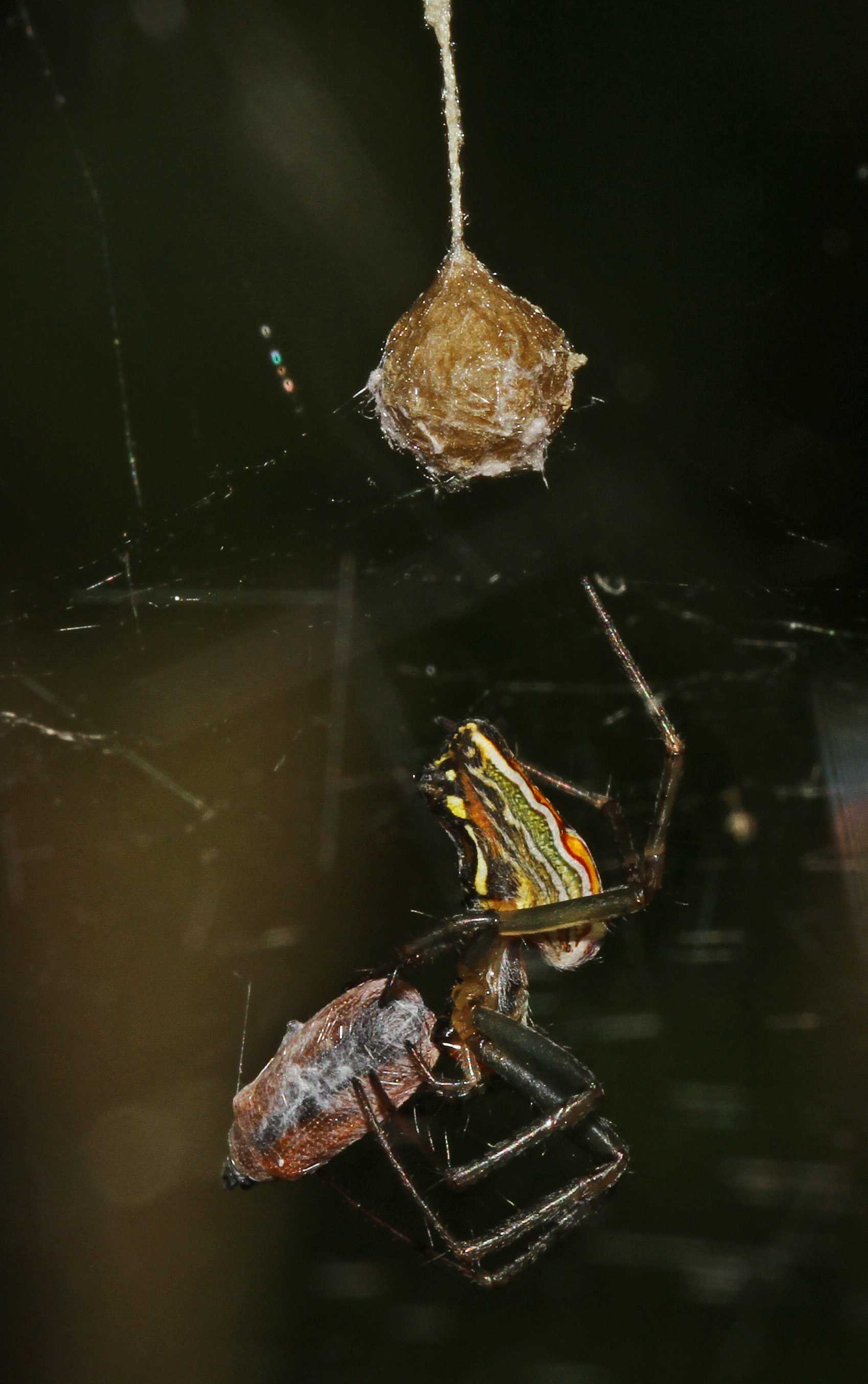

Scientific classification
- Domain: Eukaryota
- Kingdom: Animalia
- Phylum: Arthropoda
- Subphylum: Chelicerata
- Class: Arachnida
- Order: Araneae
- Infraorder: Araneomorphae
- Family: Araneidae
- Genus: Mecynogea
- Species: M. lemniscata

Binomial name
- Mecynogea lemniscata (Walckenaer, 1841)

= Mecynogea lemniscata =

Species of spider

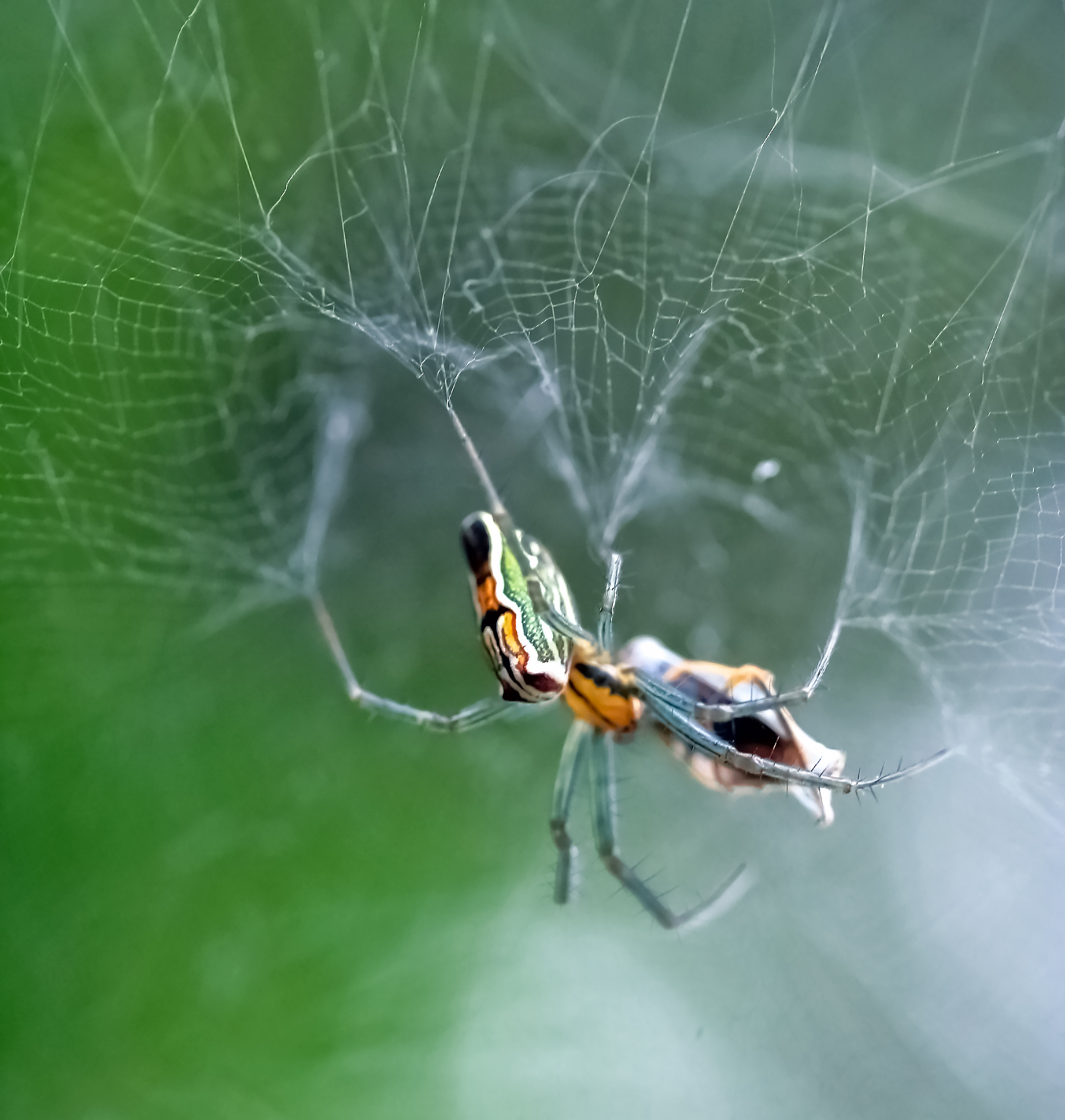
In elaborate "basilica style" web

Mecynogea lemniscata, the basilica orbweaver, is a species of orb weaver in the spider family Araneidae. It is found in a range from the United States to Argentina.

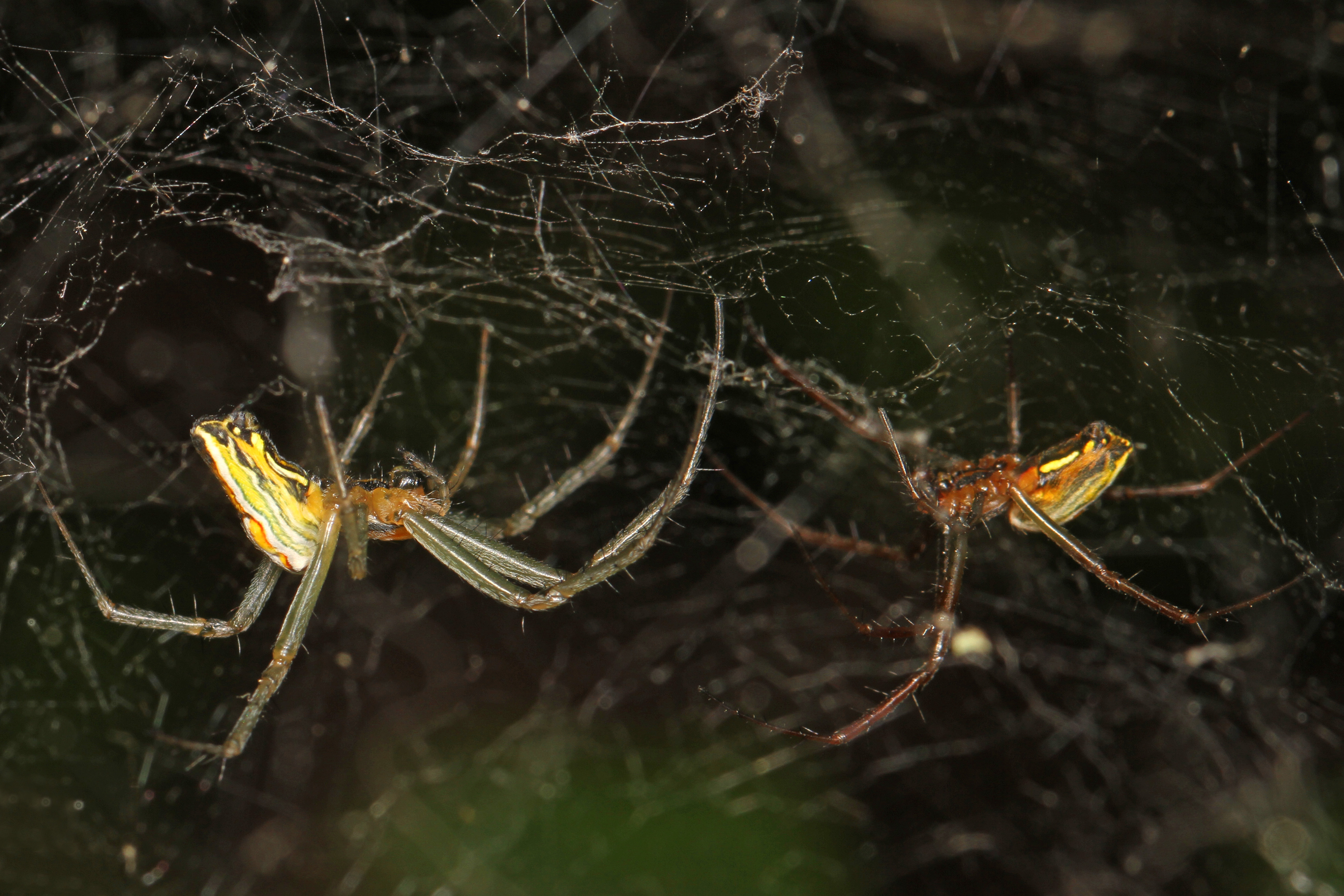
Courtship
