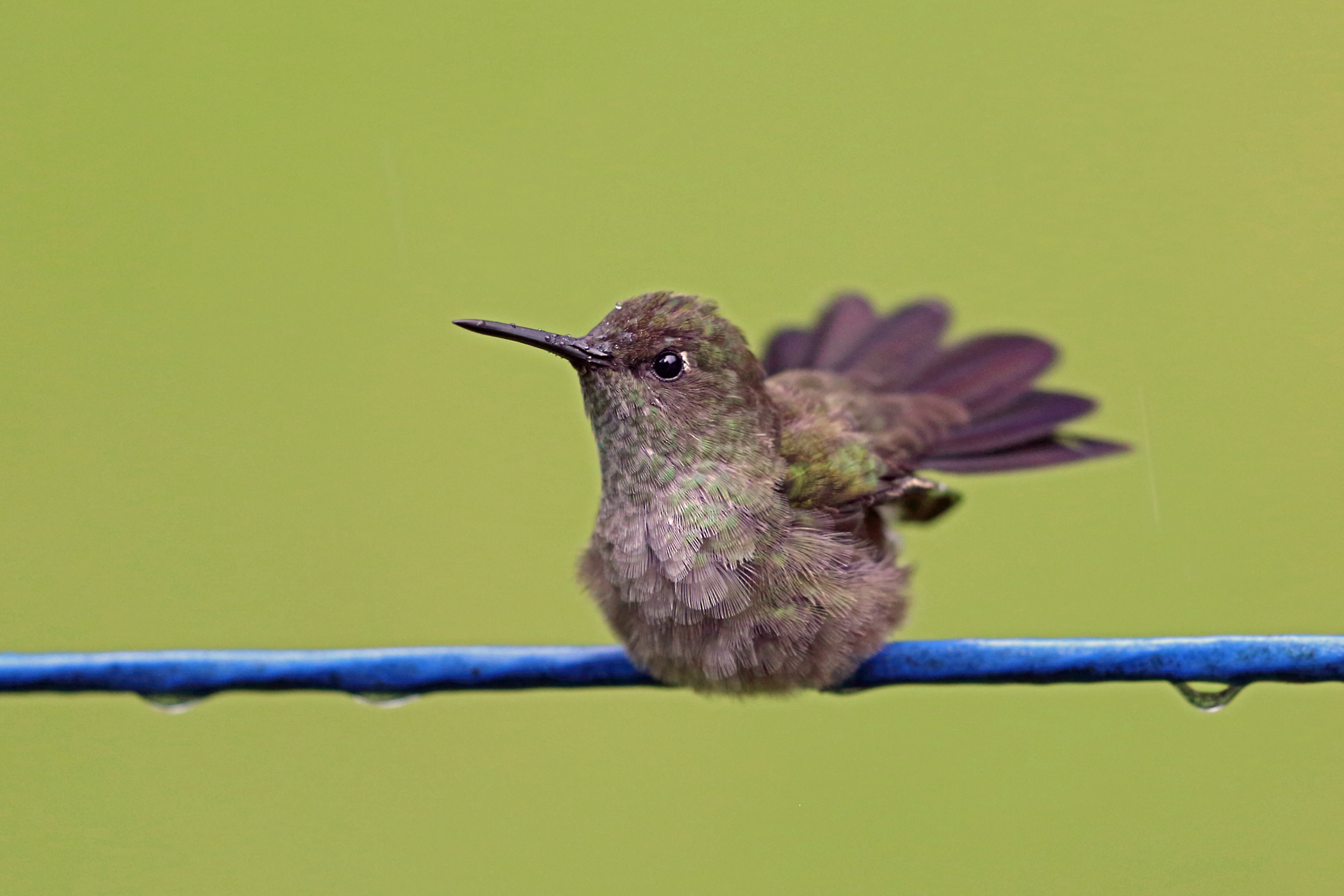

Conservation status
- Least Concern (IUCN 3.1)
- CITES Appendix II

Scientific classification
- Kingdom: Animalia
- Phylum: Chordata
- Class: Aves
- Clade: Strisores
- Order: Apodiformes
- Family: Trochilidae
- Genus: Eupetomena
- Species: E. cirrochloris

Binomial name
- Eupetomena cirrochloris (Vieillot, 1818)

Synonyms
- Campylopterus cirrochloris, Aphantochroa cirrochloris

= Sombre hummingbird =

Species of hummingbird

The sombre hummingbird (Eupetomena cirrochloris) is a species of hummingbird in the "emeralds", tribe Trochilini of subfamily Trochilinae. It is endemic to Brazil.

== Taxonomy and systematics ==
The sombre hummingbird was formerly placed in the genus Aphantochroa which was itself sometimes merged into Campylopterus. Based primarily on a molecular phylogenetic study published in 2014, Aphantochroa was merged by most taxonomic systems into Eupetomena. However, BirdLife International's Handbook of the Birds of the World retains it in Aphantochroa.

The sombre hummingbird is monotypic.

== Description ==
The sombre hummingbird is about 12 cm (4.7 in) long and weighs about 7.1 to 9 g (0.25 to 0.32 oz). The sexes are essentially the same though the female is slightly smaller than the male. They have a slightly decurved black bill. Their upperparts are bronzy green to blackish bronzy green with a coppery sheen to the uppertail coverts. Their underparts are dull gray with a few dull green spots on the throat. Their tail is square; its central feathers are shiny green and the rest black with a bronzy gloss.

== Distribution and habitat ==
The sombre hummingbird is found in eastern Brazil from Pernambuco south into Rio Grande do Sul and west as far as Mato Grosso. It inhabits the edges and understory of humid primary and secondary forest, plantations, and gardens. The core of its habitat is the Atlantic Forest but it also occurs in the transition zone between cerrado and caatinga biomes.

== Behavior ==
=== Movement ===
The sombre hummingbird is a year-round resident throughout its range.

=== Feeding ===
The sombre hummingbird forages for nectar at a variety of flowering plants including introduced Eucalyptus. It does so from the understory to as high as 30 m (100 ft) above the ground. It is highly territorial and spends half its time aggressively defending flower patches from hummingbirds of its own and other species. In addition to nectar it feeds on arthropods captured by hawking from a perch.

=== Breeding ===
The sombre hummingbird's breeding season extends from November to March. It builds a cup nest of soft plant material with large lichen pieces on the outside. It typically places it like a saddle on a horizontal branch. The female incubates the clutch of two eggs for 15 to 16 days and fledging occurs about 28 days after hatch.

=== Vocalization ===
The somber hummingbird's song is "a high-pitched 'tchui-ui', often repeated and sometimes doubled". It is typically sung at dawn and often during agonistic encounters. It gives at least six distinct calls described as "chirp", "guttural", "vibrato", "whistle", "crack", and "high-pitch".

== Status ==
The IUCN has assessed the sombre hummingbird as being of Least Concern. It has a large range, but its population size is unknown and believed to be decreasing. No immediate threats have been identified. Except in the far south of its range it is considered locally common to common and it occurs in several protected areas.
