= Rolf Grantsau =

German-Brazilian naturalist and illustrator

Rolf Karl Heinz Grantsau (March 25, 1928 Kiel – June 25, 2015) was a German-Brazilian naturalist and illustrator.

== Biography ==
Grantsau was born in 1928 in Kiel, Germany. While graduating in biology, he was a student of Erwin Stresemann. The birds-of-paradise and the hummingbirds were the groups he most appreciated while in Germany, and he eventually came to Brazil in 1962 to study the latter; he also worked on taxonomy of birds, mammals, reptiles, insects, orchids, carnivorous plants, lichens and more, and as a taxidermist. He was also an illustrator, having illustrated his own work (including books) and that of many other researchers.

He was married to Ilse Grantsau, with whom he had two children, Marion Grantsau Engelbrecht, born in Germany, and Ingo Grantsau, born in Brazil.

The following species and subspecies were described by him:

- Augastes scutatus ilseae 1967
- Phaethornis maranhaoensis 1968
- Threnetes loehkeni 1969
- Eupetonema macroura cyanoviridis 1988
- Hylocharis cyanus griseiventris 1988
- Phaethornis ochraceiventris camargoi(= Phaethornis margarettae) 1988
- Phaethornis pretrei minor 1988
- Amazona kawalli 1989 (with Hélio Camargo)
- Charadrius wilsonia brasiliensis 2008 (with P.C. Lima)
- Caprimulgus longirostris pedrolimai 2008

The species Drosera grantsaui (a carnivorous plant), Gnomidolon grantasaui (a beetle) and Formicivora grantsaui (a Thamnophilidae) were named after him.
