= Hélio Ferraz de Almeida Camargo =

Brazilian zoologist

- Born: Hélio Ferraz de Almeida Camargo; 6 June 1922; Piracicaba, Brazil
- Died: 14 July 2006 (aged 84); São Paulo, Brazil
- Scientific career
- Fields: Ornithology, Arachnology
- Workplaces: Museum of Zoology of the University of São Paulo

Hélio Ferraz de Almeida Camargo (6 June 1922 – 14 July 2006) was a Brazilian zoologist and lawyer, who primarily worked with Brazilian birds.

== Life ==
Camargo was born in the city of Piracicaba, São Paulo, in 1922, son of Theodureto Leite de Almeida Camargo and Davina Ferraz de Almeida Camargo. He studied Law in the University of São Paulo, graduating in 1952. However, he was deeply interested in zoology and began working in 1944 as a trainee in the Zoology Department of Secretaria da Agricultura do Estado de São Paulo – which in 1969 became the Museum of Zoology of the University of São Paulo, being effectivated as biologist in 1946. Camargo started working with Dr. Olivério Pinto, taking the administration of the bird section of the museum after his retirement. From 1966 to 1979, he was substitute director of the museum, until retiring in 1980, but continued working as the curator of the bird section until 2001.

The bulk of his work was with Brazilian birds diversity, going to field to collect specimens for the museum in various biomes of the country and publishing the results of his observations. In 1989 he described, with Rolf Grantsau, the new amazon species Amazona kawalli. He also worked in the fish section of the museum and during the 1950s he studied spiders, even naming three new Brazilian species: Parawixia inopinata Camargo, 1951, Wagneriana gavensis (Camargo, 1951) and Tetragnatha soaresi, which he synonymized as junior synonym of T. longidens Mello-Leitão, 1945, in 1953.

In recognition of his work in ornithology, the hummingbird Phaethornis ochraceiventris camargoi Grantsau, 1988 and the furnarid Heliobletus contaminatus camargoi Silva & Stotz, 1992 were named after him.
