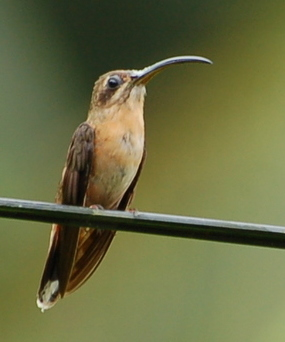

Conservation status
- Least Concern (IUCN 3.1)
- CITES Appendix II

Scientific classification
- Kingdom: Animalia
- Phylum: Chordata
- Class: Aves
- Order: Apodiformes
- Family: Trochilidae
- Genus: Glaucis
- Species: G. aeneus

Binomial name
- Glaucis aeneus Lawrence, 1868

= Bronzy hermit =

Species of hummingbird

The bronzy hermit (Glaucis aeneus) is a species of hummingbird in the family Trochilidae. It is found in Colombia, Costa Rica, Ecuador, Honduras, Nicaragua, and Panama.

== Taxonomy and systematics ==
The bronzy hermit and the rufous-breasted hermit (G. hirsutus) have been considered conspecific but now are treated as a superspecies. The bronzy hermit is monotypic although the separate Central and South American populations have sometimes been treated as subspecies.

== Description ==
The bronzy hermit is 9 to 10 cm (3.5 to 3.9 in) long. Males weigh 3 to 6.5 g (0.11 to 0.23 oz) and females 3 to 6 g (0.11 to 0.21 oz). The male's bill is decurved and the maxilla has serrated edges. The female's bill has more curve and no serrations. The sexes' plumages are alike, with bronzy or coppery green upperparts, deep buff thoat and breast, and pale buff belly. The face has a white "moustache" and is otherwise dusky. The upperside of the tail is gray-green with white tips and the underside reddish near the body, blackish in the middle, and white at the tips. The Central American population has slightly longer wings than the South American but their plumages are identical.

== Distribution and habitat ==
The bronzy hermit has two separate populations. One is found from eastern Honduras through eastern Nicaragua and eastern and western Costa Rica into western Panama. The other is found from western Colombia into northwestern Ecuador as far south as Pichincha Province. The species inhabits semi-open landscapes such as disturbed primary forest, mature secondary forest, swamp forest, and shrublands. In elevation it occurs from sea level to 750 m (2,500 ft) in Costa Rica and 800 m (2,600 ft) in Colombia.

== Behavior ==
=== Movement ===
The bronzy hermit is believed to be non-migratory throughout its range.

=== Feeding ===
The bronzy hermit feeds on nectar at Heliconia and other plants. Small arthropods are also eaten; the latter are usually hover-gleaned from spider webs, leaves, and twigs, and occasionally caught in flight.

=== Breeding ===
The bronzy hermit's breeding season varies geographically by has not been fully defined. Its nest is a cone-shaped cup made of plant fibers bound with spider web and decorated with lichens, attached to the underside of a drooping leaf. The clutch size is two eggs.

=== Vocalization ===
The bronzy hermit's song is "a high-pitched descending phrase 'tsee-tsee-tsi-tsi-tsitstitsi' irregularly altered with a series of high-pitched 'seee' notes". Its flight call is "a sharp high-pitched 'tzeeet!'."

== Status ==
The IUCN has assessed the bronzy hermit as being of Least Concern, though its population number and trend are not known. It occurs in several protected areas, and is deemed "very common" in Colombia.

== Additional reading ==
- A Guide to the Birds of Costa Rica by F. Gary Stiles and Alexander F. Skutch ISBN 0-8014-9600-4
- Hummingbirds of Costa Rica by Michael Fogden and Patricia Fogden ISBN 1-55407-163-1
