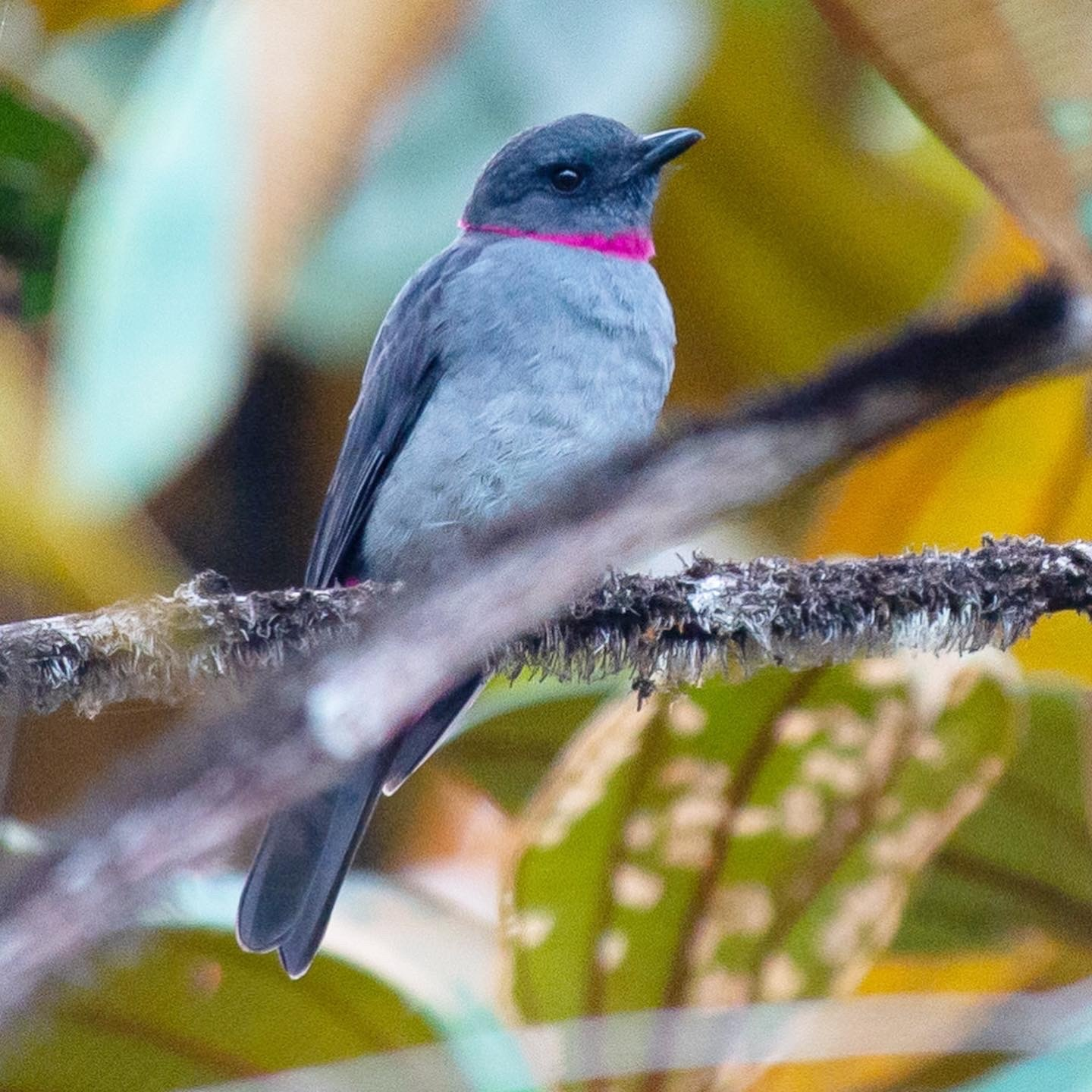

Conservation status
- Least Concern (IUCN 3.1)

Scientific classification
- Kingdom: Animalia
- Phylum: Chordata
- Class: Aves
- Order: Passeriformes
- Family: Cotingidae
- Genus: Lipaugus
- Species: L. streptophorus

Binomial name
- Lipaugus streptophorus (Salvin & Godman, 1884)

Synonyms
- Lathria streptophora (protonym)

= Rose-collared piha =

Species of bird

The rose-collared piha (Lipaugus streptophorus) is a species of bird in the family Cotingidae, the cotingas. It is found in Brazil, Guyana, and Venezuela.

== Taxonomy and systematics ==
The rose-collared piha was originally described as Lathria streptophora. It was later transferred to its current genus Lipaugus that had been erected in 1828.

The rose-collared piha is monotypic.

== Description ==
The rose-collared piha is 20 to 22 cm (7.9 to 8.7 in) long. The species is sexually dimorphic, which is uncommon among Lipaugus cotingas. Adult males have a wide pinkish magenta collar that separates their medium gray head from their medium gray upperparts, wings, and tail. Their underparts are mostly paler gray with pinkish magenta undertail coverts. Adult females are slightly smaller than males; they have no collar and their undertail coverts are cinnamon-rufous. The male's plumage is unique. Females resemble the screaming piha (Lipaugus vociferans), which has the same two-toned gray plumage but with entirely pale gray underparts.

== Distribution and habitat ==
The rose-collared piha is found on tepuis in the region where Venezuela's eastern Bolívar state, far western Guyana, and extreme northern Roraima state in Brazil meet. It inhabits the interior and edges of humid montane forest at elevations between 1,000 and 1,800 m (3,300 and 5,900 ft).

== Behavior ==
=== Movement ===
The rose-collared piha is a year-round resident.

=== Feeding ===
The rose-collared piha primarily feeds on fruits, especially those of Melastomataceae, and also includes small numbers of insects in its diet. It sometimes forages singly but more often in pairs or small family groups. It perches for long periods, often in the open, and plucks fruit while briefly hovering after a short flight.

=== Breeding ===
The rose-collared piha's breeding season appears to begin in April but nothing else is known about the species' breeding biology.

=== Vocalization ===
The rose-collared piha is not highly vocal; it calls infrequently at dawn and irregularly a few times during the day. Its song is "a clear, whistled sueeet-suEEEeeeeoo, sliding up then down." It more often gives "single swEEEeeu, rising whistled preeEE!, or longer, rising SWEEEEEET!" calls.

== Status ==
The IUCN has assessed the rose-collared piha as being of Least Concern. It has a restricted range; its population size is not known and is believed to be decreasing. No immediate threats have been identified. It is "apparently uncommon, possibly local, but may be more numerous in some places." It is not considered at risk because "much intact forest remains on [the] slopes of table mountains, which are difficult of access for humans."
