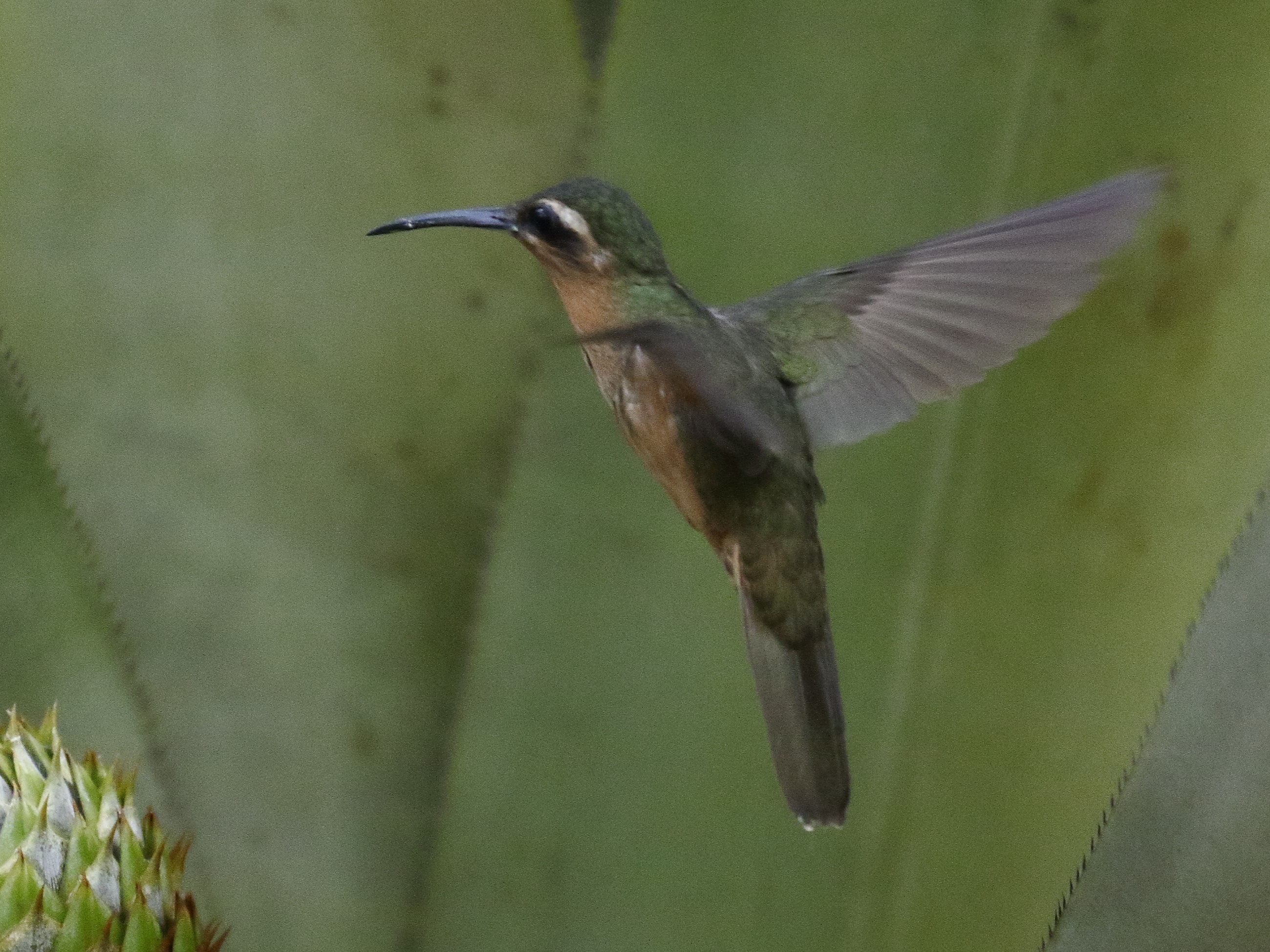

Conservation status
- Vulnerable (IUCN 3.1)
- CITES Appendix I

Scientific classification
- Kingdom: Animalia
- Phylum: Chordata
- Class: Aves
- Order: Apodiformes
- Family: Trochilidae
- Genus: Glaucis
- Species: G. dohrnii

Binomial name
- Glaucis dohrnii (Bourcier & Mulsant, 1852)

Synonyms
- Ramphodon dohrnii (Bourcier & Mulsant, 1852)

= Hook-billed hermit =

Species of hummingbird

The hook-billed hermit (Glaucis dohrnii) is a threatened species of hummingbird in the family Trochilidae. It is endemic to a small area of Brazil.

== Taxonomy and systematics ==
The hook-billed hermit was for a time placed in genus Ramphodon, but morphological characteristics place it firmly in Glaucis. It is monotypic.

== Description ==
The hook-billed hermit is 12 to 13 cm (4.7 to 5.1 in) long. Males weigh 6 to 9 g (0.21 to 0.32 oz) and females 5.5 to 7 g (0.19 to 0.25 oz). Its upperparts are greenish bronze and the underparts cinnamon. The face has a white supercilium and "moustache" and is otherwise dusky. The tail is metallic bronze with white-tipped outer feathers. Its bill is nearly straight. The sexes have essentially the same plumage though the female's underparts are somewhat paler than the male's.

== Distribution and habitat ==
The hook-billed hermit is found only at a few sites in the southeastern Brazilian states of Bahia and Espírito Santo in Neotropical realm forest climates. It probably formerly occurred in Minas Gerais and possibly Rio de Janeiro states, though in the latter it is known only from trade skins that might have originated elsewhere. It inhabits the understory of inland primary and littoral forests, usually along streams. It favors areas with abundant Heliconia plants. In elevation it ranges from sea level to 500 m (1,600 ft).

== Behavior ==
=== Movement ===
The hook-billed hermit is thought to be sedentary or a non migration period lifestyle. However, the few records from any one site make that determination difficult.

=== Feeding ===
Like other hermit hummingbirds, the hook-billed hermit is a "trap-line" feeder, visiting a circuit of flowering plants. It feeds on nectar at Heliconia and other plants and also on small arthropods, but details are lacking.

=== Breeding ===
The hook-billed hermit's breeding season is believed to span from September to February. The nest is made from plant material and cobwebs under the tip of a long drooping leaf. Its clutch is two eggs.

=== Vocalization ===
The hook-billed hermit's song is described as similar to those of the rufous-breasted hermit (G. hirsutus), a "rapid 'seep-seep-seep'", and the saw-billed hermit (Ramphodon naevius), "a descending series...of 'seee' notes."

== Status ==
The IUCN originally assessed the hook-billed hermit in 1988 as Threatened, then in 1994 as Critically Endangered, then in 2000 as Endangered, and in 2021 as Vulnerable. Its small range has undergone massive deforestation and what remains is fragmented. Its population is estimated at under 10,000 mature individuals and is believed to be decreasing. It may now only occur only in a few reserves and national parks in Bahia and one in Espírito Santo.
