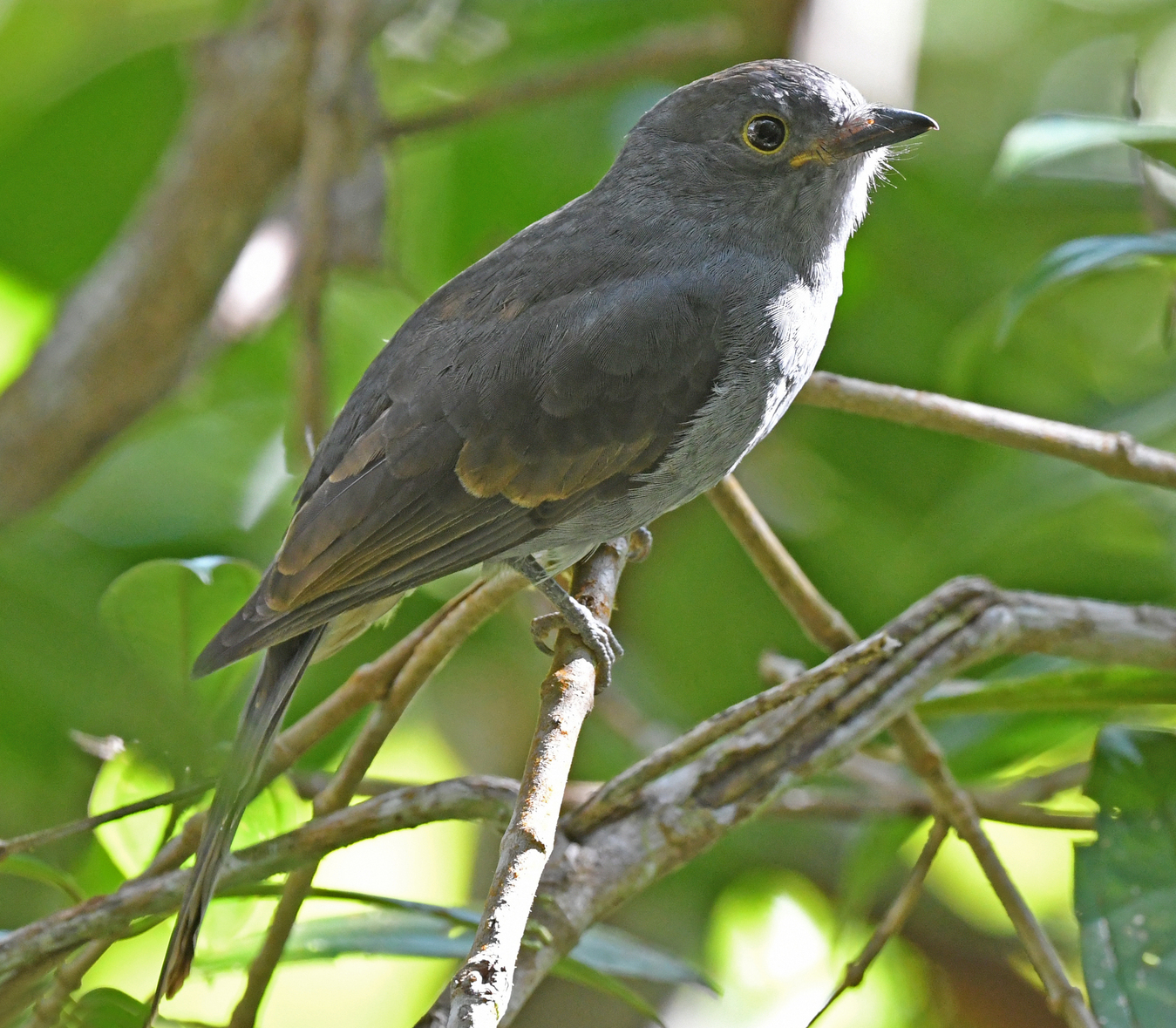

Conservation status
- Critically Endangered (IUCN 3.1)

Scientific classification
- Kingdom: Animalia
- Phylum: Chordata
- Class: Aves
- Order: Passeriformes
- Family: Cotingidae
- Genus: Lipaugus
- Species: L. weberi

Binomial name
- Lipaugus weberi Cuervo, Salaman, Donegan & Ochoa, 2001
- Geographic distribution shown in green on map of Colombia

= Chestnut-capped piha =

Species of bird

The chestnut-capped piha (Lipaugus weberi) is a species of bird in the family Cotingidae. It is endemic to a small portion of Colombia's central Andes in the department of Antioquia. The chestnut-capped piha resides only in a narrow band of humid premontane cloud forest. It is a dark grey passerine with a notable chestnut crown on the upper nape and pale cinnamon-colored undertail coverts. Adults are small for pihas, measuring about 20 to 25 cm (8 to 10 in) long. Males have modified primary feathers with elongated and stiff barbules that enable them to create a whirring noise with their wings, which the piha likely uses for display purposes. Its call is extremely loud and can be heard over 100 m (330 ft) away. The chestnut-capped piha is mostly frugivorous, although it will eat some invertebrates. Little is known about the species' breeding ecology, although it is believed to be a lekking species.

The chestnut-capped piha was not discovered until 1999, due in large part to the very limited and to political instability in central Colombia. The chestnut-capped piha is considered by the IUCN to be critically endangered, and the population may be as low as 250 birds. It is primarily threatened by habitat destruction as its cloud forests are converted into usage for farming, mining, and agriculture. Although several reserves have been set up to protect portions of its range, more conservation work needs to be done to protect the species from extinction.

== Taxonomy ==
During the late nineteenth and twentieth centuries, the area infrastructure led many ornithological expeditions to explore the northern Cordillera Central mountains; however, the northern premontane slopes remained largely unexplored before political instability closed off the area until the 1990s. On March 31, 1999, during survey work to compile an inventory of the avifauna of the La Forsoza region, the first known chestnut-capped piha was captured, photographed, and released by ornithologists Andrés M. Cuervo, José M. Ochoa, Sandra Galeano, and Juan Carlos Luna. Following the capture of a second bird in May, Cuervo began to speculate that the unusual pihas were an undescribed species. In August 1999 a rapid survey across a wide swathe of the region encountered the unknown piha on numerous occasions, and in some areas it was one of the more common species present. Two birds which were mist netted during this survey were collected and became the holotype and paratype when the species was described in 2001. The species' discovery led to hopes that more undescribed species existed in this portion of Colombia will be discovered; since the newly discovered bird species from central Colombia that includes the Magdalena tapaculo, Stiles's tapaculo, Antioquia brushfinch, and Antioquia wren.

The chestnut-capped piha is also known as the chestnut-capped cotinga and Antioquia piha. Locals call the species Arrierito Antioqueño, which translates to the "little herdsman of Antioquia", because its call reminds them of the whistles made by horsemen herding cattle. The genus name Lipaugus comes from the Greek lipaugēs, meaning "dark" or "devoid of light". The specific name weberi is in honor of Walter H. Weber, a Colombian ornithologist from Medellín known for promoting conservation and the study of birds in Antioquia. The chestnut-capped piha has no subspecies, and seems to be most closely related to the dusky piha. It may form a superspecies with the dusky, cinnamon-vented, and scimitar-winged pihas.

== Description ==
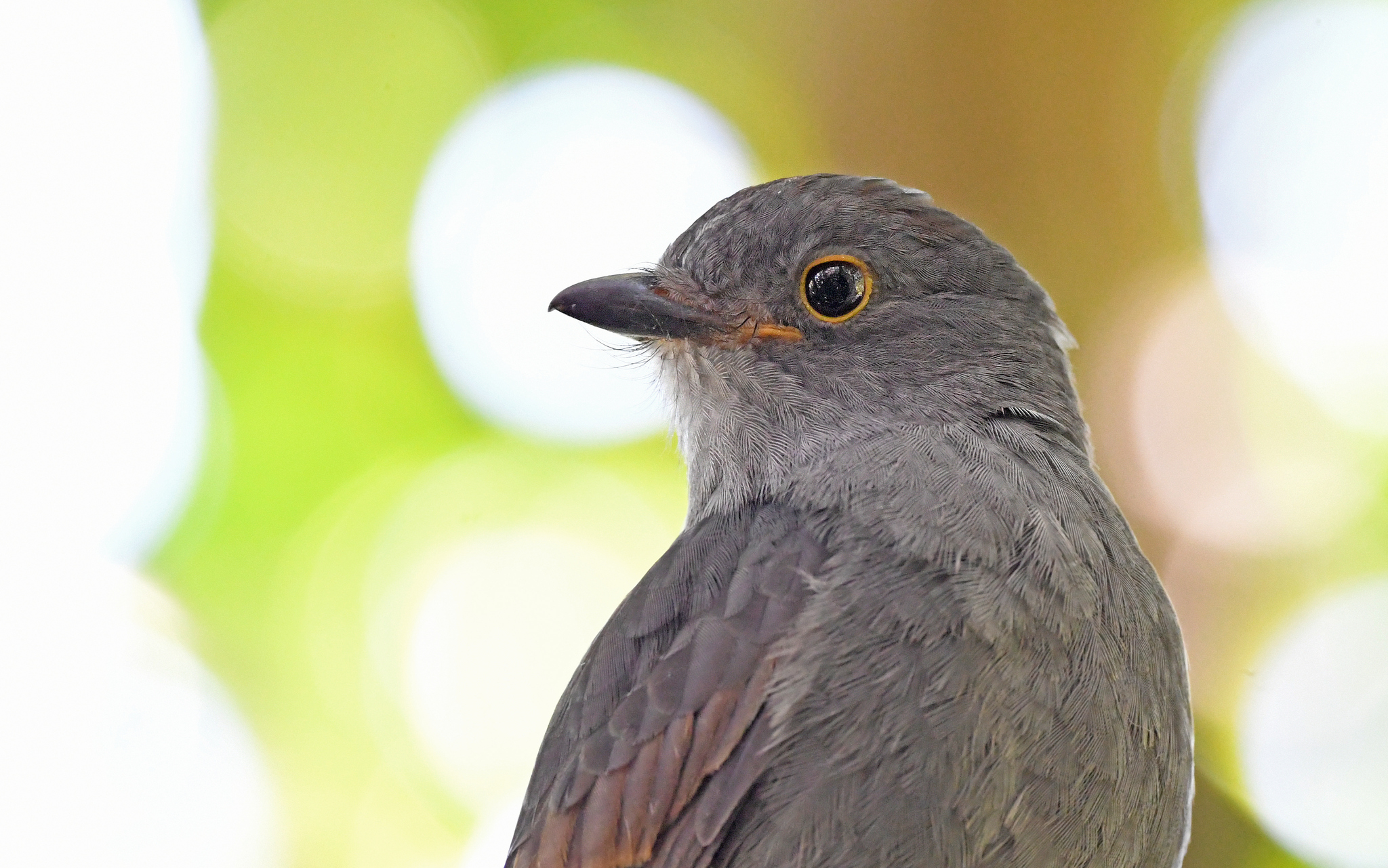
Close-up of the chestnut-capped piha's head.

Overall the chestnut-capped piha is a dark grey bird with a notable chestnut crown on the upper nape and pale cinnamon-colored undertail coverts. The upperparts and wing coverts are a dark grey with paler fringes to most of the feathers. The flight feathers are a dark brownish grey with cinnamon-colored fringes on the secondaries and tertials. As the bird's feathers wear, the pale fringes tend to darken, leaving the bird even more uniform grey in coloration. The underwing is a pale silvery grey. The underparts are a paler shade of grey than the upperparts, particularly on the throat. The tail is a dark greyish-brown, and is noticeably long and forked. The legs and feet are also dark grey, although they have contrasting yellow soles. In addition to its namesake chestnut crown, the bird's head is marked by a dark brown iris and a narrow orbital ring that is a bright yellow. The bird's beak is black and relatively deep and broad at its base, and has a very hooked tip. It also has short rictal bristles and obvious nostrils. Adult chestnut-capped pihas are small for pihas, measuring about 20 to 25 cm (8 to 10 in) long and weighing between 69.4 and 72.2 g (2.45 and 2.55 oz).

The sexes are similar in appearance, although the male is suspected to be slightly larger than the female. Males also have slightly different primary feathers where the barbules are elongated and stiff, allowing the males to create a whirring noise with their wings. Molting appears to occur around August, with males molting earlier than females.

Juveniles have a far less obvious chestnut crown than the adults, but have brighter and broader rufous fringes on their secondaries and tertials. Their irises are also a greyer shade of dark brown. Juvenile males also have not yet developed the modified primary feathers of the adult.

While no other pihas have been found to share the chestnut-capped piha's habitat, making it unlikely to be confused with another species, it is distinguished from the closely related dusky piha by its relatively smaller size, greyer plumage, distinctive chestnut crown, and yellow orbital ring.

=== Voice ===
Like most pihas, the chestnut-capped piha is extremely and conspicuously vocal. Its call is a loud, piercing sreeck which rises in pitch before abruptly descending. These calls are given repetitively in a series at one-second intervals, although when agitated they can be given every third of a second, and can be heard over 100 m (330 ft) away. The chestnut-capped piha calls sporadically throughout the day and year-round. The species also produces a quiet, nasal gluck-gluck which is believed to be a contact call.

== Distribution and habitat ==
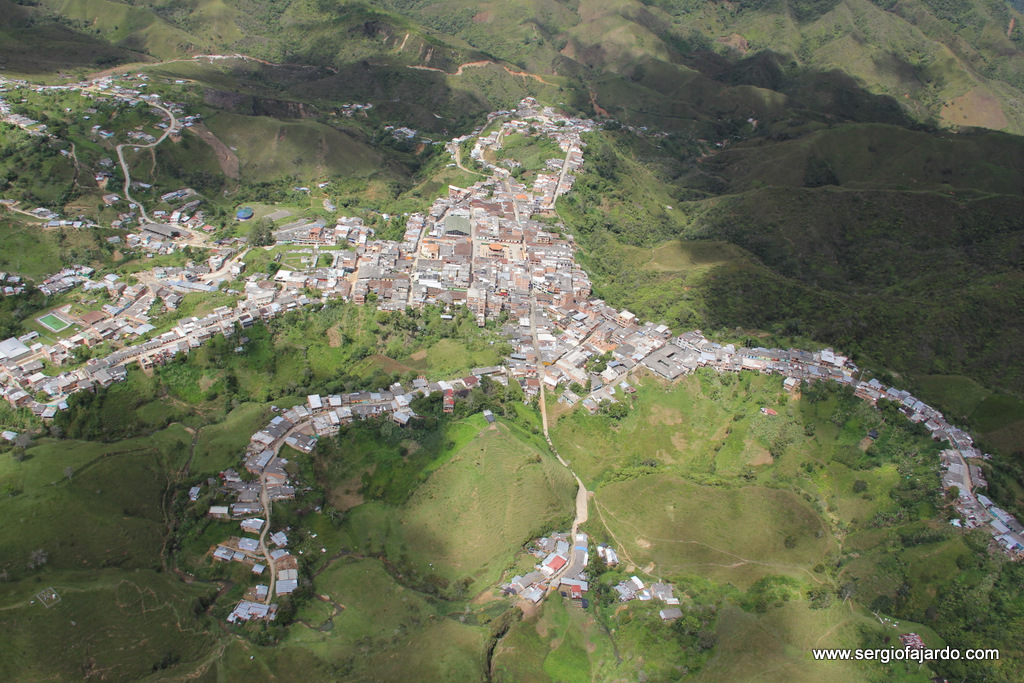
An aerial view of Anorí, near which is the majority of the piha's range.

The chestnut-capped piha is endemic to the central Andes of Colombia. It is only found on the northern slope of the Cordillera Central mountains near the towns of Amalfi and Anorí in the department of Antioquia. Sixteen distinct populations are known from this area just east of the Nechí River Valley, with most of the populations being located closer to Anorí, likely due to more extensive habitat destruction over a longer period of time near Amalfi. Despite the large number of populations, in 2014 it was estimated that its surviving habitat only covered between 42 and 357.5 km^{2} (10,400 and 88,300 acres).

The species is limited to living in a very narrow band of extremely humid, premontane cloud forest between 1,400 and 1,925 m (4,600 and 6,300 ft) in elevation, although it is suspected that birds may venture as low as 1,200 m (3,900 ft). This piha seems to be most common between 1,600 and 1,750 m (5,200 and 5,700 ft). The cloud forest is dominated by trees in the genera Guarea, Pouteria, Protium, Roucheria, Vochysia, Virola, and Clusia. The species prefers pristine cloud forest, and may need blocks of at least 30 ha (74 acres) of habitat to thrive; however, it may be able to tolerate some selective logging and habitat fragmentation, although as a lower population density. The chestnut-capped piha is non-migratory.

== Ecology and behavior ==
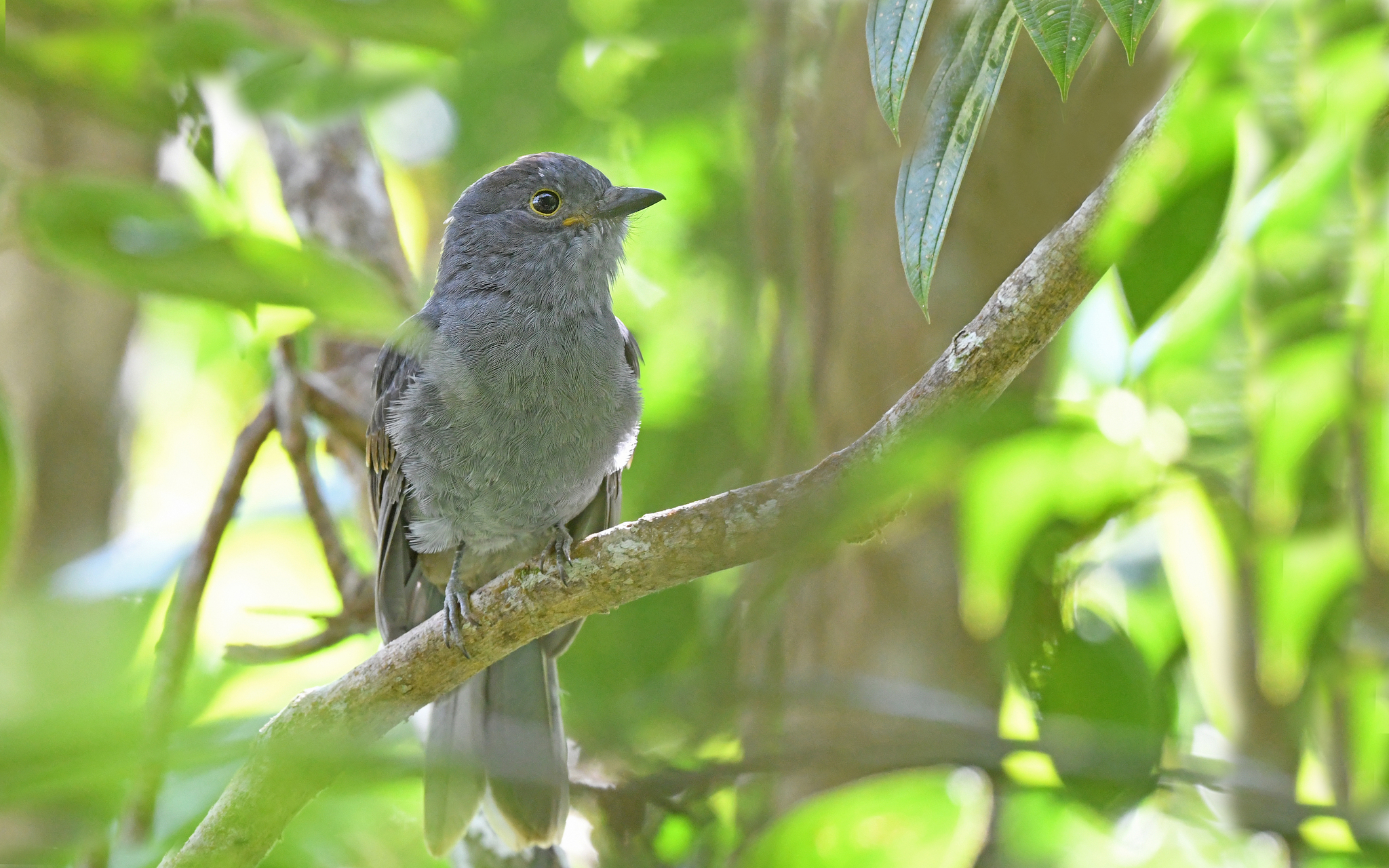
Chestnut-capped piha perched on branch

The piha is typically found between the midstory and lower canopy of its cloud forest, and has been observed joining mixed-species foraging flocks in the upper canopy, although typically only for the amount of time needed for the flock to pass through the piha's territory. The species tends to be sluggish and relatively inactive. While perching, the chestnut-capped piha tends to adapt a more horizontal position than the other pihas, which typically perch very upright. When agitated, the piha flicks its tail upwards and raises its crown feathers. The piha is parasitized by at least one species of tick in the genus Acaro.

The chestnut-capped piha is mostly frugivorous, although it will eat some invertebrates. The fruits eaten by this piha are small to medium-sized and come from a variety of plant families, including Myrsinaceae, Euphorbiaceae, Caprifoliaceae, Linaceae, Lauraceae, Aquifoliaceae, and Melastomataceae. The laurels in particular seem to be a preferred fruit for the species. The piha typically picks the fruit by hover-gleaning on short sallying flights, although the species will infrequently eat fruits from a perched position. Larger fruits are occasionally bashed against a branch prior to being eaten.

The nest and breeding behavior of the chestnut-capped piha has not been described. It is assumed to have similar behavior to the closely related dusky piha, and likely forms leks where males use their modified primary feathers to produce a whirring noise with their wings. In March 2000, a survey found the species was mostly paired off and frequently vocalizing, suggesting that the breeding season was about to begin. A juvenile piha collected in early June was likely only a few months old.

== Conservation ==
The chestnut-capped piha was listed as endangered on the IUCN Red List between 2002 and 2015, when it was reclassified as a critically endangered species, due in large part to its small range and habitat destruction. (Note: The conservation status of the chestnut-capped piha was assessed for the IUCN for the first time in 2002.) Within its range, the cloud forest is being converted into pastureland and farmland, particularly for coffee and plantains. Other pieces of former habitat have been affected by gold mining and soil erosion. Additionally, some of its habitat has been replaced by invasive species or by pine and cypress plantations. While there is some evidence that the species may be able tolerate some logging in its territory, it is much less common in fragmented habitat. Three quarters of its original habitat is believed to have been lost, including 9% between 2000 and 2010 alone. Climate change is also believed to pose a future threat to the species due to the piha's very specific habitat requirements; as temperatures rise, the piha will have to move upslope to maintain a favorable climate. However, the need to move upslope will likely outstrip the forest's ability to do so in response to the changing climate. When the species was initially described, the population was estimated to be around 2,500; however, in 2014 it was reevaluated and estimated that there may be fewer than 250 chestnut-capped pihas remaining. In 2014 it was listed as Colombia's eighth most endangered bird species, and it has been named a priority conservation species by the Alliance for Zero Extinction.

Some portions of the piha's range are protected, including the 4.5 km^{2} (1,100 acres) Reserva Natural La Forzosa where the bird was first discovered; this site had actually been declared a reserve by a local landowner prior to the species' discovery. In 2006, the American Bird Conservancy purchased the 5.3 km^{2} (1,300 acres) Arrierito Antioqueño Bird Reserve to be managed by Fundación ProAves. Two smaller reserves, the La Serrana Municipal Reserve and the Caracolí-Guayabito Reserve, also protect portions of its habitat. Further efforts to conserve portions of the chestnut-capped piha's range and limit its conversion to agricultural usage, particularly in the Riachón River valley, as well as additional surveys to clarify its current distribution, population, and any genetic variation between the Amalfi and Anorí populations, are needed to further protect the species.

== Relationship with humans ==
The chestnut-capped piha was featured on a Colombian $1,500 postage stamp in 2008.
