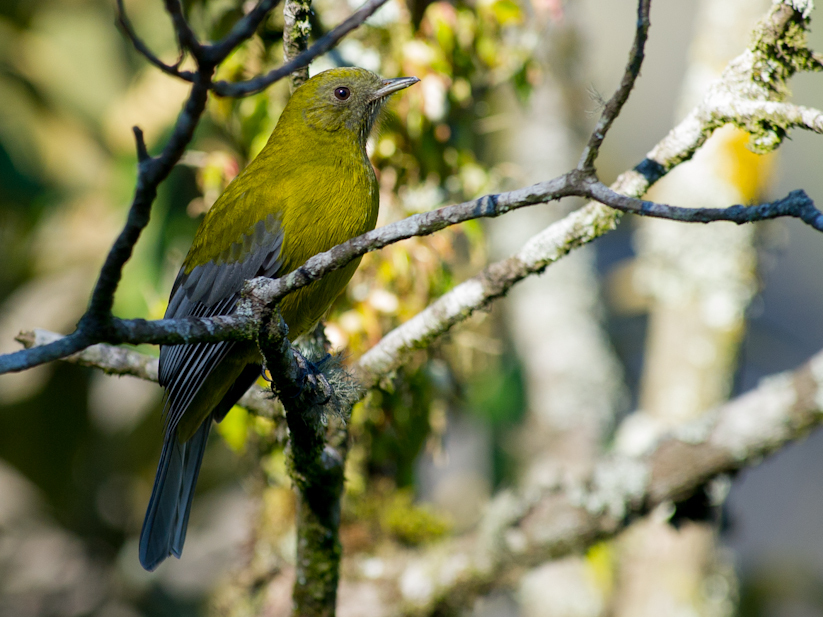

Conservation status
- Vulnerable (IUCN 3.1)

Scientific classification
- Kingdom: Animalia
- Phylum: Chordata
- Class: Aves
- Order: Passeriformes
- Family: Cotingidae
- Genus: Lipaugus
- Species: L. conditus

Binomial name
- Lipaugus conditus (Snow, 1980)

= Grey-winged cotinga =

Species of bird

The grey-winged cotinga (Lipaugus conditus) is a Vulnerable species of bird in the family Cotingidae. It is endemic to Brazil.

== Taxonomy and systematics ==
The grey-winged cotinga was originally described as Tijuca condita. The type specimen had been collected in 1942 and classified as a female black-and-gold cotinga (then T. atra, now Lipaugus ater). Analyses of feather proteins in the specimen and black-and-gold cotingas proved that it was a separate species. The species' specific epithet conditus is from Latin conditus, stored away or hidden, in reference to the specimen's "hiding" under the wrong name for 30 years. The type specimen remains the only one of the species.

Not long after the species was described there were suggestions that genus Tijuca was a sister genus to Lipaugus. A molecular phylogenetic study published in 2014 found that Tijuca was embedded within Lipaugus so taxonomic systems subsumed Tijuca into Lipaugus.

The grey-winged cotinga is monotypic.

== Description ==
The grey-winged cotinga is about 24 cm (9.4 in) long. The sexes are mildly sexually dimorphic. Adult males have an olive-green crown and a dull grayish face. Their upperparts are mostly olive-green with a yellower rump. Their wings and tail are a darker olive-green than their back, and the outer webs of the wing's flight feathers are silvery gray. Their underparts are olive-yellow that is yellower on the belly. They have a brown iris, a dark gray maxilla, a yellow-olive mandible, and dark horn legs and feet. Females are smaller than males and have duller body plumage that is more yellow and especially so on the rump. Their wings are grayer than the male's. They have a more delicate bill, legs, and feet than males.

== Distribution and habitat ==
The grey-winged cotinga is found only in Brazil's Rio de Janeiro state. There it is known only from Serra dos Órgãos, Serra do Tinguá, Araras Biological Reserve and Nova Caledônia. It inhabits very humid elfin forest heavy with bromeliads. In elevation it ranges between 1,350 and 2,000 m (4,400 and 6,600 ft) though most of the few records are above 1,560 m (5,100 ft).

== Behavior ==
=== Movement ===
The grey-winged cotinga "[p]robably wanders at least occasionally to levels well below high-altitude elfin forest".

=== Feeding ===
The grey-winged cotinga feeds on berries, with those of Melastomataceae specifically identified. Nothing else is known about its diet or foraging behavior.

=== Breeding ===
The grey-winged cotinga's breeding season appears to include November but nothing else is known about the species' breeding biology.

=== Vocalization ===
The grey-winged cotinga's song is a "very/extr. high, sharp, slow tue-twée or t-twée-tee-deedeé".

== Status ==
The IUCN originally in 1988 assessed the grey-winged cotinga as Threatened and since 1994 as Vulnerable. It has a very restricted range, though it overall spans about 1,200 km^{2} (460 sq mi) it is estimated to occupy only about 400 km^{2} (150 sq mi) of it. Its estimated population of between 250 and 1000 mature individuals is believed to be stable. "There are no obvious immediate threats to the species or its habitat. Forests within the range remain largely intact, with tree cover loss being negligible at present [2021]. Nevertheless, logging may become a potential concern, with eucalyptus plantations encroaching on habitat below the species' elevation range." It is considered rare. It occurs in four protected areas but at least one of them is threatened by poachers.
