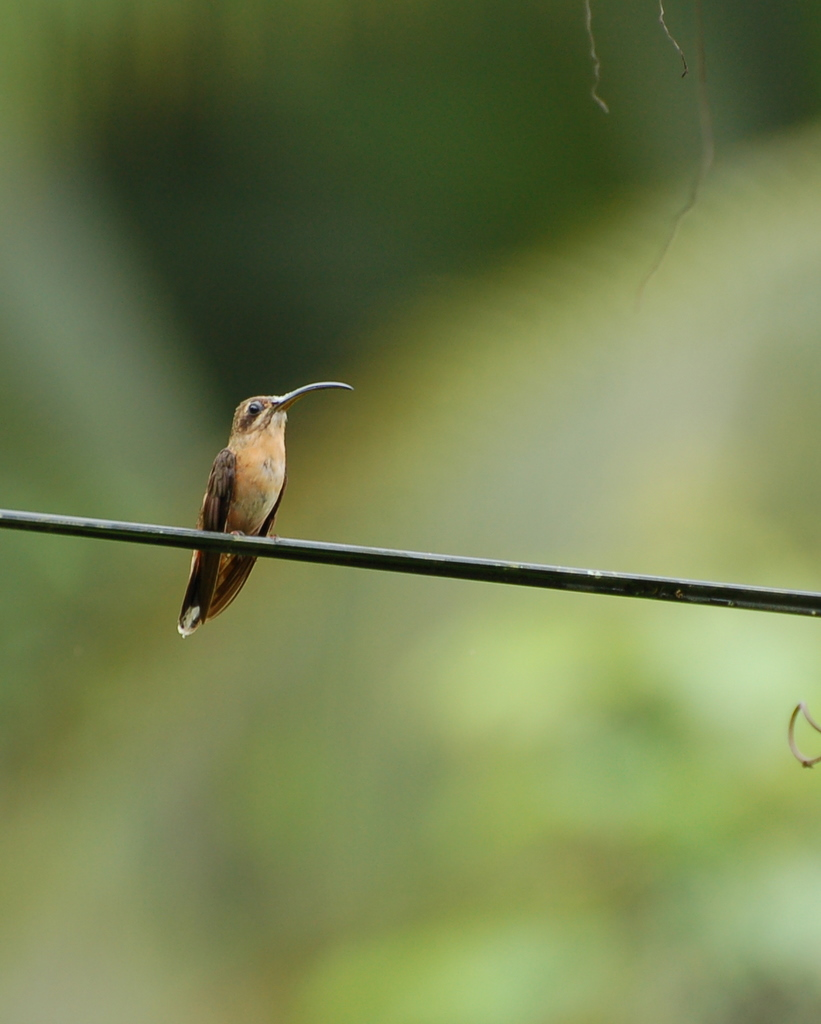
- Bronzy hermit, Glaucis aeneus

Scientific classification
- Kingdom: Animalia
- Phylum: Chordata
- Class: Aves
- Order: Apodiformes
- Family: Trochilidae
- Subfamily: Phaethornithinae
- Genus: Glaucis; Boie, F, 1831

Type species
- Trochilus brasiliensis = Trochilus hirsutus Latham, 1790

Species
- 3, see text

= Glaucis =

Genus of birds

Glaucis is a genus of hummingbird in the family Trochilidae.

== Taxonomy ==
The genus Glaucis was introduced in 1831 by the German zoologist Friedrich Boie. The type species was designated as the rufous-breasted hermit by George Robert Gray in 1840. The genus name is from the Ancient Greek glaukos meaning "blue-grey", "glaucous" or "pale green".

The genus contains the following three species:

Genus Glaucis – Boie, F, 1831 – three species
Common name	Scientific name and subspecies	Range	Size and ecology	IUCN status and estimated population
Bronzy hermit	Glaucis aeneus Lawrence, 1868	Eastern Honduras south to western Panama, and in the Chocó of western Colombia and north-western Ecuador	Size: Habitat: Diet:	LC
Hook-billed hermit	Glaucis dohrnii (Bourcier & Mulsant, 1852)	eastern Brazil	Size: Habitat: Diet:	VU
Rufous-breasted hermit or hairy hermit	Glaucis hirsutus (Gmelin, JF, 1788) Two subspecies: G. h. insularum Hellmayr & Seilern, 1913 – Grenada, Trinidad and Tobago; G. h. hirsutus (Gmelin, JF, 1788) – Panama and west Colombia through Venezuela and the Guianas to Brazil and north Bolivia	Panama south to Bolivia, and on Trinidad, Tobago and Grenada	Size: Habitat: Diet:	LC
