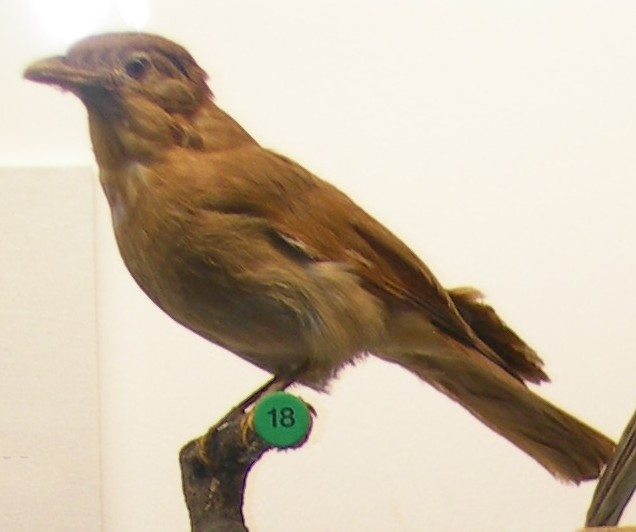
- Rufous piha (Lipaugus unirufus)

Scientific classification
- Kingdom: Animalia
- Phylum: Chordata
- Class: Aves
- Order: Passeriformes
- Family: Cotingidae
- Genus: Lipaugus; F. Boie, 1828

Type species
- Muscicapa plumbea Lichtenstein, 1823

= Lipaugus =

Genus of birds

Lipaugus is a genus of birds in the family Cotingidae.

== Taxonomy ==
The genus was introduced by the German zoologist Friedrich Boie in 1828. Boie spelled the genus name as Lipangus but this was corrected to Lipaugus. The name comes from the Greek lipaugēs, meaning "dark" or "devoid of light". The type species was designated by George Gray in 1840 as the screaming piha.

The genus contains nine species.

Image	Scientific name	Common name	Distribution
	Lipaugus unirufus	Rufous piha	Belize, Colombia, Costa Rica, Ecuador, Guatemala, Honduras, Mexico, Nicaragua, and Panama
	Lipaugus streptophorus	Rose-collared piha	south-eastern Venezuela, western Guyana and far northern Brazil
	Lipaugus vociferans	Screaming piha	Amazon and tropical parts of the Mata Atlântica in South America
	Lipaugus lanioides	Cinnamon-vented piha	southeastern Brazil.
	Lipaugus ater (formerly in Tijuca)	Black-and-gold cotinga	Serra do Mar in south-eastern Brazil
	Lipaugus conditus (formerly in Tijuca)	Grey-winged cotinga	Serra dos Órgãos and Serra do Tinguá in Rio de Janeiro State of Brazil
	Lipaugus weberi	Chestnut-capped piha	Colombia
	Lipaugus fuscocinereus	Dusky piha	Colombia, Ecuador, and Peru
	Lipaugus uropygialis	Scimitar-winged piha	Bolivia and Peru

Two former Lipaugus species are now in the genus Snowornis. The dusky, chestnut-capped, cinnamon-vented, and scimitar-winged pihas may form a superspecies.
