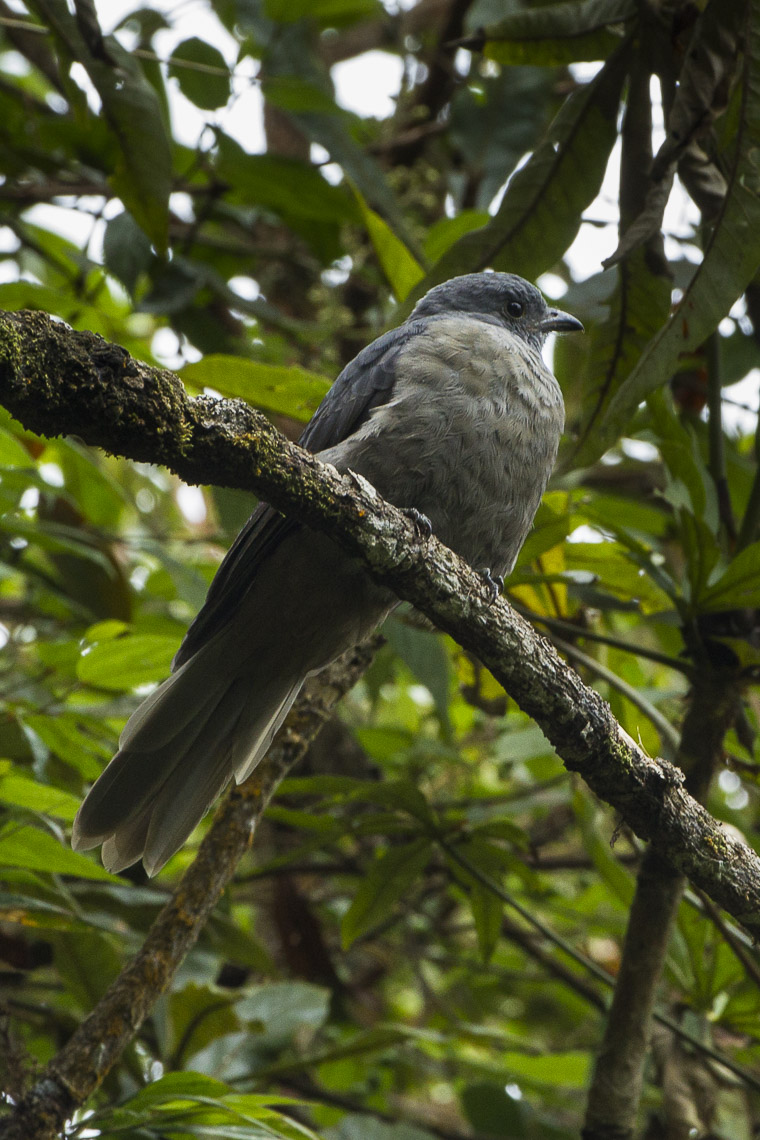

Conservation status
- Least Concern (IUCN 3.1)

Scientific classification
- Kingdom: Animalia
- Phylum: Chordata
- Class: Aves
- Order: Passeriformes
- Family: Cotingidae
- Genus: Lipaugus
- Species: L. fuscocinereus

Binomial name
- Lipaugus fuscocinereus (Lafresnaye, 1843)

Synonyms
- Querula fusco-cinerea (protonym)

= Dusky piha =

Species of bird

The dusky piha (Lipaugus fuscocinereus) is a species of bird in the family Cotingidae, the cotingas. It is found in Colombia, Ecuador, and Peru.

== Taxonomy and systematics ==
The dusky piha was originally described as Querula fusco-cinerea, mistakenly placing it as a member of the Old World flycatcher family. It was later transferred to its current genus Lipaugus that had been erected in 1828.

The dusky piha is monotypic. It and the scimitar-winged piha (L. uropygialis) are sister species; the chestnut-capped piha (L. weberi) may also belong to that clade.

== Description ==
The dusky piha is the largest member and has the longest tail of genus Lipaugus. They are 31 to 33 cm (12 to 13 in) long and weigh 120 to 138 g (4.2 to 4.9 oz). The sexes have the same plumage. Adults have medium gray upperparts and duskier gray wings and tail. Their underparts are paler gray with a brownish wash on the breast and belly. They have a dark brown iris, a dark brown or blackish bill with a paler base to the mandible, and gray legs and feet. Immatures have rufous tips on the wing coverts.

== Distribution and habitat ==
The dusky piha is a bird of the Andes. It is found along all three ranges of the Colombian Andes and south along the eastern slope through Ecuador slightly into far northern Peru north of the Marañón River valley. It inhabits the canopy and edges of montane forest and mature secondary forest in the subtropical and temperate zones. In elevation it ranges between 1,800 and 3,100 m (5,900 and 10,200 ft) in Colombia, between 1,700 and 2,600 m (5,600 and 8,500 ft) in Ecuador, and between 2,125 and 2,250 m (7,000 and 7,400 ft) in Peru.

== Behavior ==
=== Movement ===
The dusky piha is believed to be a year-round resident.

=== Feeding ===
The dusky piha is known to feed on fruit and probably eats insects as well. It usually forages in small groups that regularly join mixed-species feeding flocks. It plucks fruit with a brief sally from a perch.

=== Breeding ===
The one known dusky piha nest was found in Ecuador in late March. It was a flattish cup made from vine tendrils on a platform of sticks; it was perched on the fork of a horizontal branch about 8.5 m (30 ft) above the ground. It held one egg that was pale beige with brown and lavender markings. The incubation period, time to fledging, and details of parental care are not known. Males perhaps court females in loose leks.

=== Vocal and non-vocal sounds ===
The dusky piha's song is a loud "pee-a-weeee or pee-a-weeee-a-weeee" whose last syllable slurs down the scale. Its wings make a loud noise during courtship display.

== Status ==
The IUCN has assessed the dusky piha as being of Least Concern. It has a large range; its population size is not known and is believed to be decreasing. No immediate threats have been identified. It is considered uncommon in Colombia, scarce and local in Ecuador, and rare and local in Peru. "Numbers have certainly been reduced by extensive deforestation of Andes at subtropical and temperate levels."
