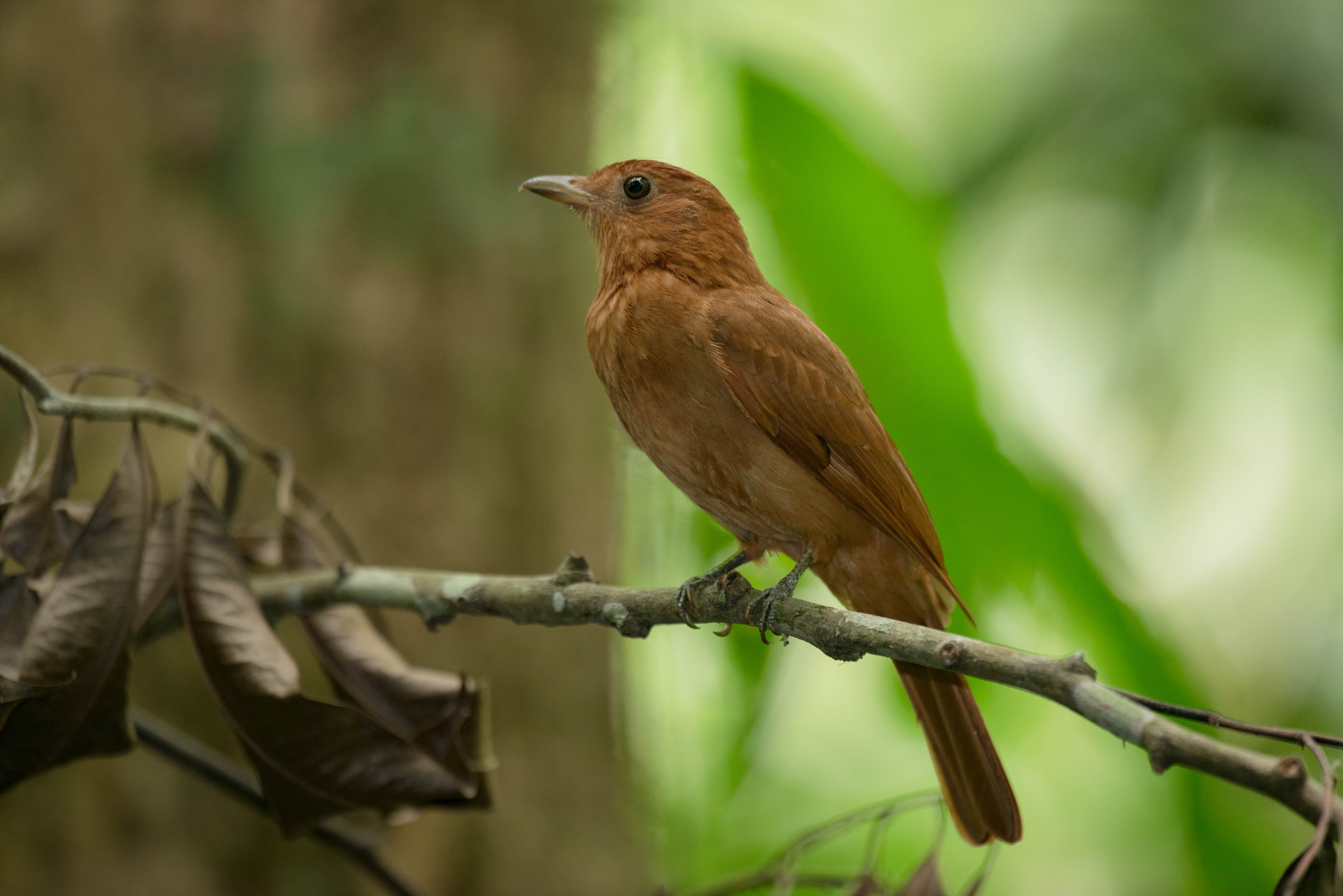

Conservation status
- Least Concern (IUCN 3.1)

Scientific classification
- Kingdom: Animalia
- Phylum: Chordata
- Class: Aves
- Order: Passeriformes
- Family: Cotingidae
- Genus: Lipaugus
- Species: L. unirufus

Binomial name
- Lipaugus unirufus Sclater, PL, 1860

= Rufous piha =

Species of bird

The rufous piha (Lipaugus unirufus) is a species of bird in the family Cotingidae, the cotingas. Its range extends from southern Mexico throughout Central America and the Chocó-Magdalena region.

== Taxonomy and systematics ==
The rufous piha has two subspecies, the nominate L. u. unirufus (Sclater, PL, 1860) and L. u. castaneotinctus (Hartert, EJO, 1902).

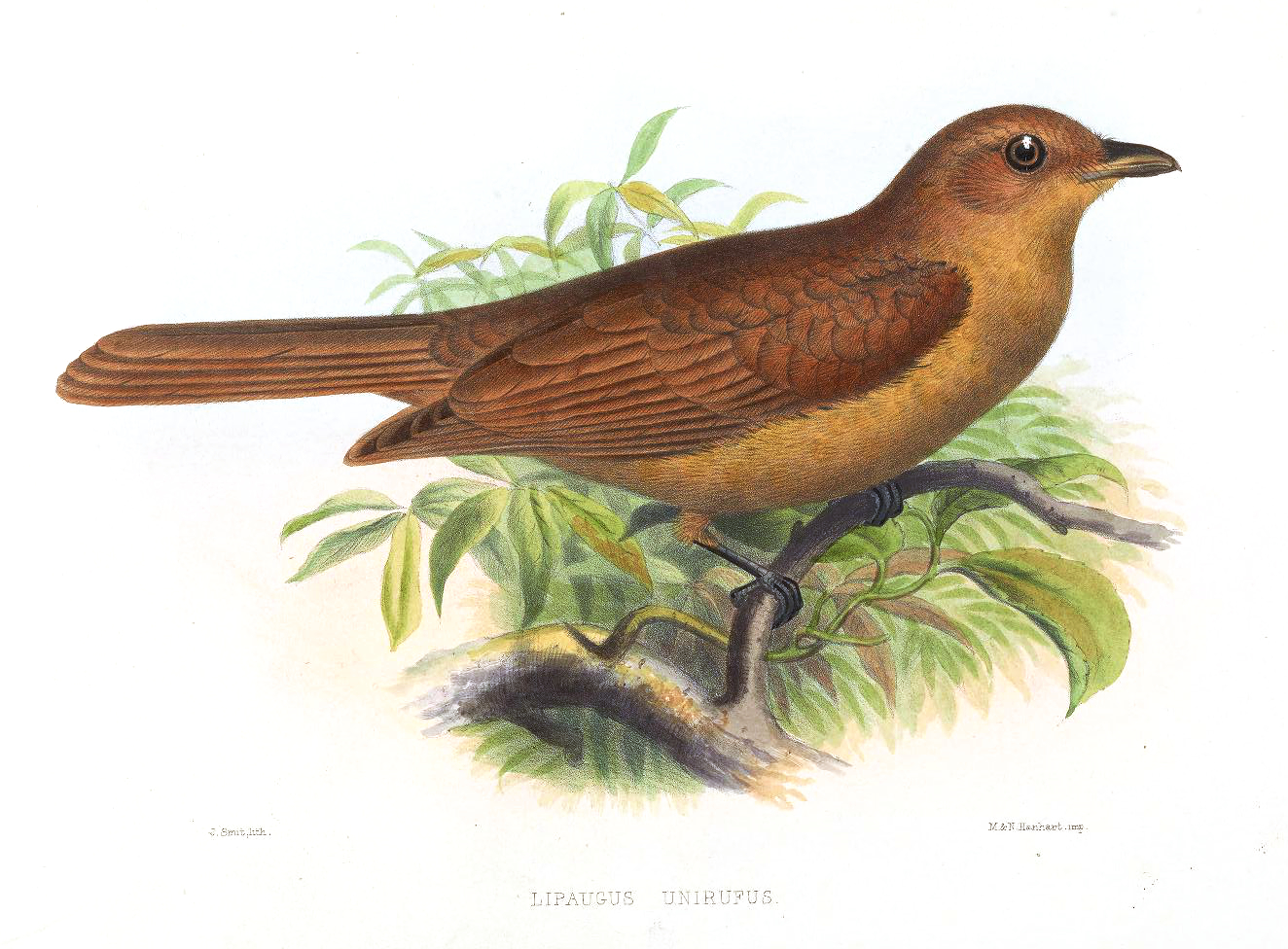
Illustration by Joseph Smit

== Description ==
The rufous piha is 22 to 26 cm (8.7 to 10 in) long; six individuals weighed 79 to 97 g (2.8 to 3.4 oz). The sexes have the same plumage. Adults of the nominate subspecies have a rufous crown with thin, somewhat lighter, streaks. The rest of their face and their upperparts are deep cinnamon brown. Their wings and tail are deep cinnamon brown with deep ochraceous buff inner webs on the remiges. Their underparts are buffy cinnamon that is darker and duller on the breast. Subspecies L. u. castaneotinctus has darker, more chestnut cinnamon upperparts than the nominate. Both subspecies have a dark brown iris, a dusky gray maxilla, a dull buffy brown mandible with a gray tip, and gray to brown legs and feet. The rufous piha looks similar to the rufous mourner (Rhytipterna holerythra) and speckled mourner (Laniocera rufescens), and the three share much of their ranges.

== Distribution and habitat ==
The nominate subspecies of the rufous piha has by far the larger range of the two. It is found from southern Veracruz and northern Oaxaca in southern Mexico south on the Caribbean slope through Belize, Guatemala, Honduras, Nicaragua, Costa Rica, and Panama and from there south into western Colombia and east in Colombia to the middle of the Magdalena River valley. It also occurs separately on the Pacific slope from central Costa Rica south slightly into Panama. Subspecies L. u. castaneotinctus is found from far southwestern Colombia's Cauca Department into northwestern Ecuador's Esmeraldas Province.

The rufous piha primarily inhabits humid evergreen forest and mature secondary forest in the lowlands of the tropical zone. It occasionally is found in more open areas with scattered trees. In elevation it ranges from sea level to 1,100 m (3,600 ft) in northern Central America, to 1,200 m (3,900 ft) in Costa Rica, to 1,500 m (4,900 ft) in Colombia, and to 700 m (2,300 ft) in Ecuador.

== Behavior ==
=== Movement ===
The rufous piha is a year-round resident.

=== Feeding ===
The rufous piha feeds on a variety of insects and other arthropods like spiders, on berries, and on other fruits such as those of palms and laurels. It typically forages singly, though sometimes in small loose flocks, and rarely joins mixed-species feeding flocks. It perches for long periods from the forest's mid-story to its canopy before making short flights to take fruit or insects in a brief hover.

=== Breeding ===
Almost all of the information about the rufous piha's breeding biology comes from Skutch's observations in Costa Rica. The species is polygynous, and males apparently court females in a loose lek but often attract them singly with calls. The breeding season in Costa Rica spans March to August. The species' nest is a shallow loose cup made from a variety of twigs, vines, and plant fibers and placed on horizontal branches about 5 to 10 m (15 to 35 ft) above the ground. The clutch is one egg that is smoky gray or grayish brown with heavy dark brown markings. The incubation period is 25 to 26 days and fledging occurs 28 to 29 days after hatch. The female does most of the incubation and brooding of nestlings, and both parents provision nestlings.

=== Vocalization ===
The calls of the nominate subspecies of the rufous piha are described as "a very loud, scratchy, electric-sounding WIIII'WERRRE! or Peuuur-WIIII'WERRRRE!, or just a single peeuuurr". Those of subspecies L. u. castaneotinctus are similar, "a variety of loud and explosive whistled calls, e.g., peeeéuw, wheeeéo, and chow-eeéo" that are sometimes given in a short series.

== Status ==
The IUCN has assessed the rufous piha as being of Least Concern. It has a very large range; its estimated population of at least 50,000 mature individuals is believed to be decreasing. No immediate threats have been identified. It is considered uncommon to rare in northern Central America, uncommon on the Caribbean slope and fairly common on the Pacific slope in Costa Rica, locally fairly common in Colombia, and fairly common in Ecuador. "Rufous Piha is a forest species, which occupies a region that already has been subjected to widespread deforestation [and] habitat loss remains a potential threat to this species."
