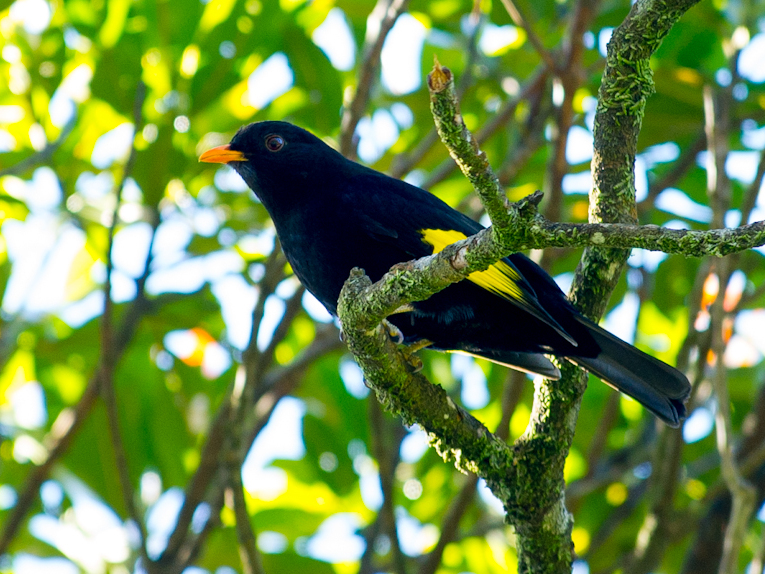

Conservation status
- Least Concern (IUCN 3.1)

Scientific classification
- Kingdom: Animalia
- Phylum: Chordata
- Class: Aves
- Order: Passeriformes
- Family: Cotingidae
- Genus: Lipaugus
- Species: L. ater

Binomial name
- Lipaugus ater (Férussac, 1829)

= Black-and-gold cotinga =

Species of bird

The black-and-gold cotinga (Lipaugus ater) is a species of bird in the family Cotingidae. It is endemic to Brazil.

== Taxonomy and systematics ==
The black-and-gold cotinga was originally described as Tijuca atra. By the late 1900s there were suggestions that genus Tijuca was a sister genus to Lipaugus. A molecular phylogenetic study published in 2014 found that Tijuca was embedded within Lipaugus so taxonomic systems subsumed Tijuca into Lipaugus.

The black-and-gold cotinga is monotypic.

== Description ==
The black-and-gold cotinga is 25 to 28 cm (9.8 to 11 in) long. The sexes are strongly sexually dimorphic. Adult males are entirely black but for a large golden yellow patch on the wing's flight feathers (remiges). They have a reddish brown iris, a bright orange bill with a slight hook on the end, and dark brown legs and feet. Females are overall dull olive-green which is yellower on the edges of the flight feathers and belly. They much resemble the monomorphic grey-winged cotinga (L. condita) and their ranges overlap. Their bill is a duller orange than the male's.

== Distribution and habitat ==
The black-and-gold cotinga is found in southeastern Brazil, ranging intermittently in extreme eastern São Paulo, extreme eastern Minas Gerais, and southern Rio de Janeiro states. It is a bird of the Atlantic Forest biome, where it inhabits humid montane forest at elevations between 1,200 and 2,000 m (3,900 and 6,600 ft).

== Behavior ==
=== Movement ===
The black-and-gold cotinga is mostly a year-round resident but apparently makes some elevational movements.

=== Feeding ===
The black-and-gold cotinga's diet has not been detailed but is known to be primarily fruit and also include insects. Fruits of Lauraceae appear to be important. It picks most fruit while perched and occasionally with a short flutter-flight; insects are taken mostly with a short sally to foliage.

=== Breeding ===
The black-and-gold cotinga appears to nest between September and November. Nothing else is known about the species' breeding biology.

=== Vocalization ===
The black-and-gold cotinga's song is a "curious high, sharp, eerie suuuuuwíii, increasing in strength [and] upslurred midway". Two or more males alternate vocalizing from treetops, producing a continuous sound that carries a long distance.

== Status ==
The IUCN originally in 1994 assessed the black-and-gold cotinga as Near Threatened but since 2019 as being of Least Concern. It has a restricted range; its estimated population of 20,000 to 50,000 mature individuals is believed to be decreasing. "Destruction of its montane Atlantic forest has been much less extensive than in adjacent lowland areas. The species is occasionally hunted for food." Some authors consider the species rare. Others deem it locally common, numerous in several national and state parks, and "reasonably common elsewhere in suitable habitat".
