= Heinrich Boie =

German zoologist (1794–1827)

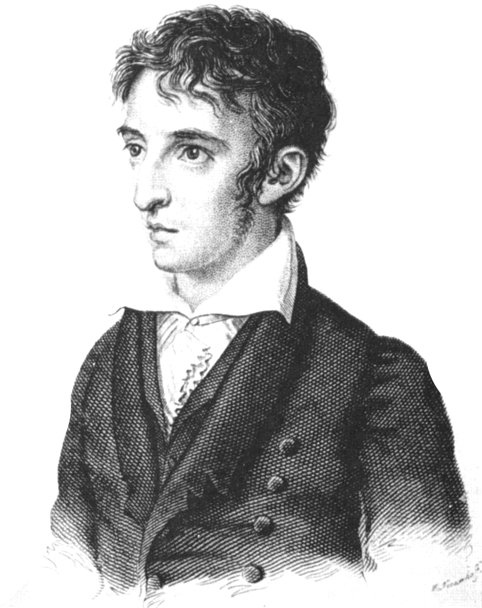
Heinrich Boie.

Heinrich Boie (4 May 1794, Meldorf, Holstein – 4 September 1827, Bogor, West Java, Indonesia) was a German zoologist. He was the brother of Friedrich Boie. In the field of herpetology they described 49 new species of reptiles and several new species of amphibians.

Heinrich Boie studied law at Kiel and Göttingen. At university he became interested in natural history through the lectures of Johann Friedrich Blumenbach and Friedrich Tiedemann. He was appointed Coenraad Jacob Temminck's assistant at Leiden. In 1825, he travelled to Java with Salomon Müller in order to collect specimens for the museum. He died there of gall fever.

A species of Indian gecko, Cnemaspis boiei, is named in honor of Heinrich Boie or his brother Friedrich Boie.

== Sources ==
- Husson AM, Holthuis LB (1955). "The dates of publication of Verhandelingen over de natuurlijke Geschiedenis der Nederlandsche overzeesche Bezittingen edited by C. J. Temminck". Zoologische Mededelingen 34: 17–24. PDF
