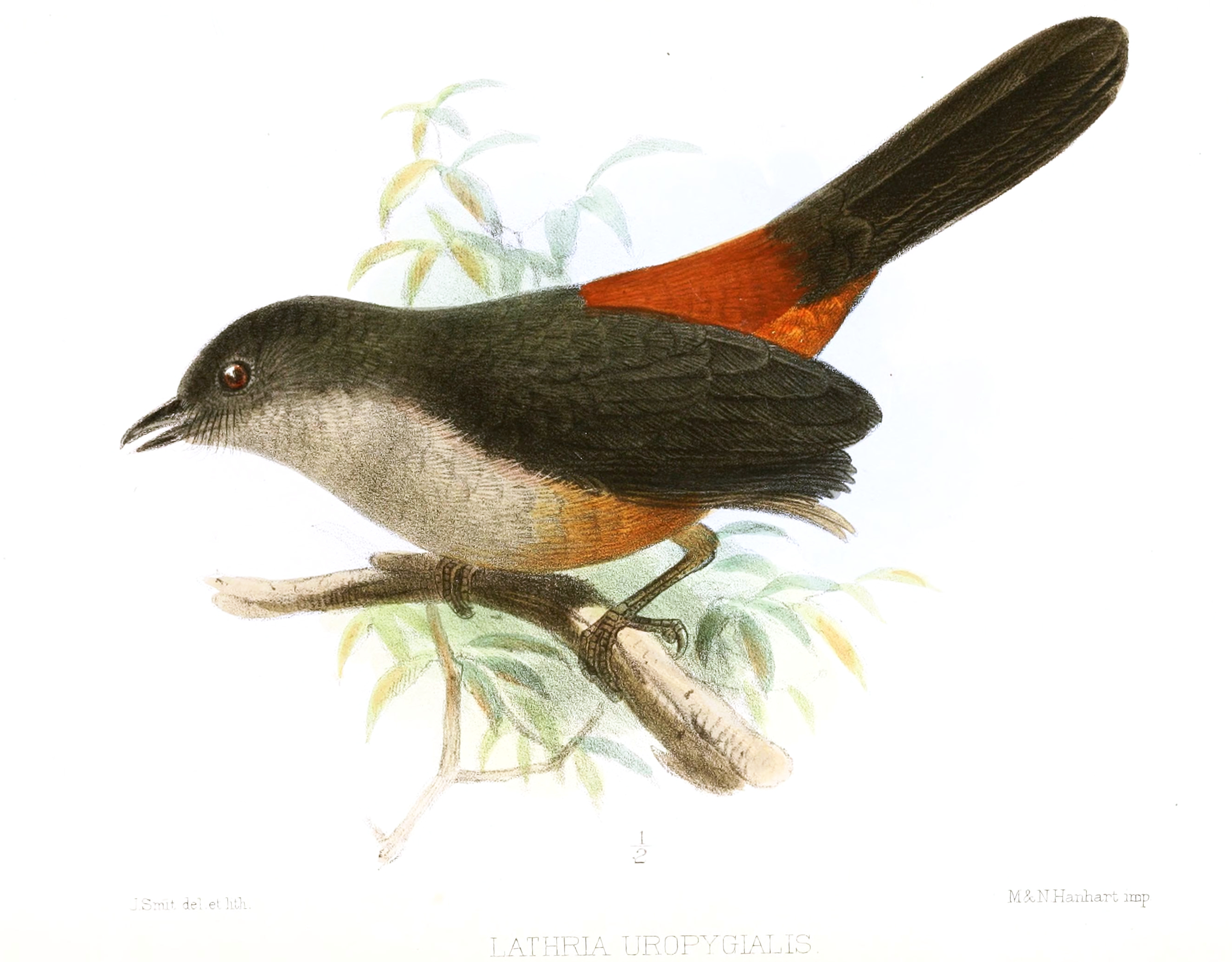
- Illustration by Joseph Smit
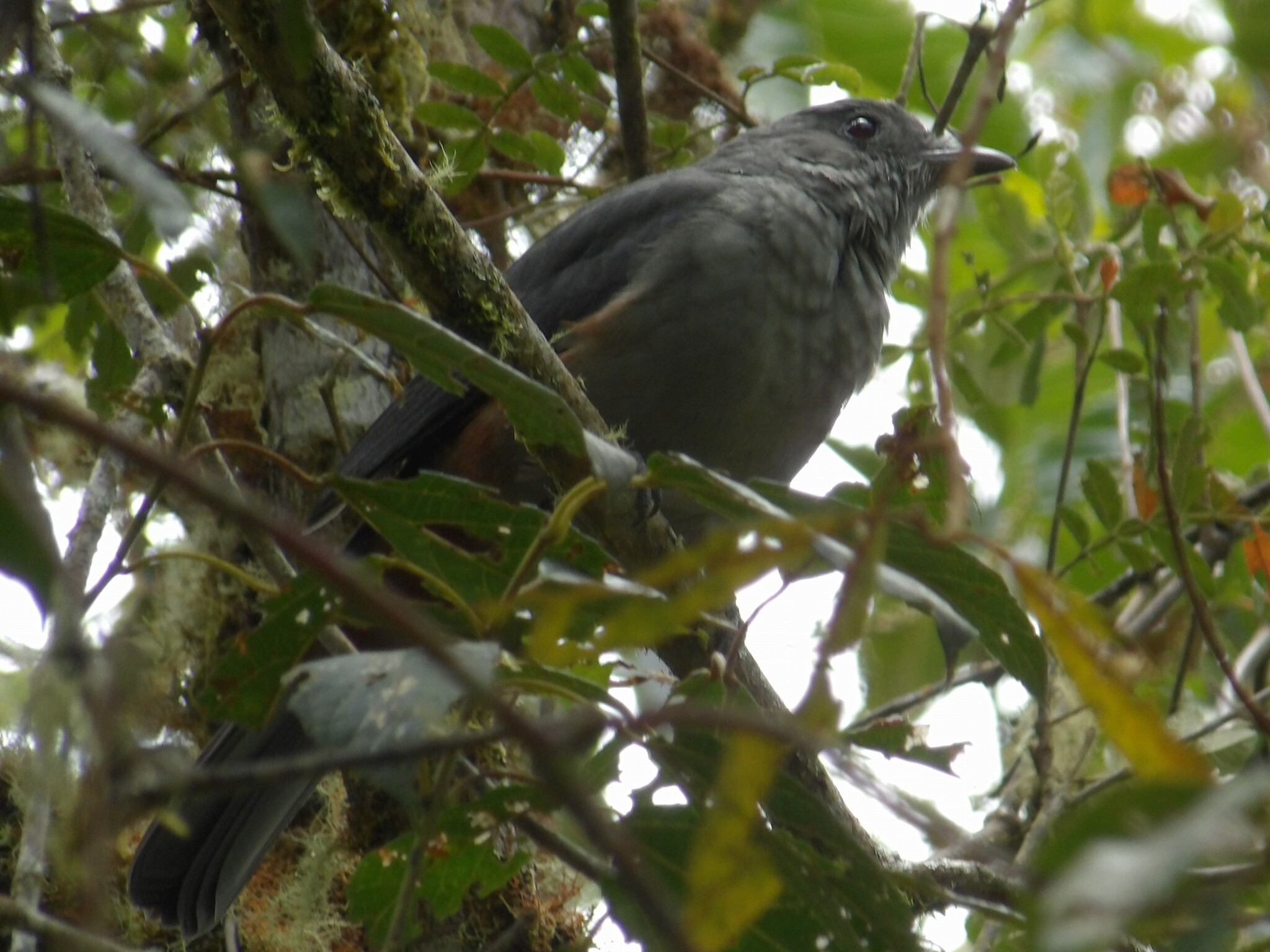

Conservation status
- Vulnerable (IUCN 3.1)

Scientific classification
- Kingdom: Animalia
- Phylum: Chordata
- Class: Aves
- Order: Passeriformes
- Family: Cotingidae
- Genus: Lipaugus
- Species: L. uropygialis

Binomial name
- Lipaugus uropygialis (Sclater, PL & Salvin, 1876)

Synonyms
- Lathria uropygialis (protonym); Chirocylla uropygialis

= Scimitar-winged piha =

Species of bird

The scimitar-winged piha (Lipaugus uropygialis) is a Vulnerable species of bird in the family Cotingidae, the cotingas. It is found in Bolivia and Peru.

== Taxonomy and systematics ==
The scimitar-winged piha was originally described as Lathria uropygialis. Because of the species' unique wing structure, the describing authors suggested that subgenus Chirocylla be used for it. Later authors elevated Chirocylla to a genus for this species alone. By the late twentieth century it had been moved by most authors to genus Lipaugus and a 2014 molecular phylogenetic study confirmed its placement there.

The scimitar-winged piha is monotypic. It and the dusky piha (L. fuscocinereous) are sister species; the chestnut-capped piha (L. weberi) may also belong to that clade.

The scimitar-winged piha's English name refers to the shape of its primaries, about which the original authors wrote, "The structure of the wing of this species is of so remarkable a character that it deserves a more lengthened notice." In males most of them bend outward in an arc like the weapon at their ends. The ends of the first two also narrow abruptly and those of the next four more gradually. Females' primaries are only slightly curved and do not narrow as much as males'.

== Description ==
The scimitar-winged piha is 30 cm (12 in) long; one male weighed 116 g (4.1 oz) and one female 135 g (4.8 oz). The sexes have the same plumage. Adults have mostly medium gray upperparts, a rufous-chestnut rump, and somewhat darker gray wings and tail. Their underparts are mostly paler gray with rufous-chestnut lower flanks and undertail coverts. They have a dark red-brown iris, a blackish maxilla, a horn-colored mandible, and plumbeous legs and feet.

== Distribution and habitat ==
The scimitar-winged piha is found on the eastern slope of the Andes of Peru on the Cuzco-Madre de Dios border and in eastern Puno Department. Its range continues into Bolivia's La Paz and Cochabamba departments. It inhabits the interior and edges of humid montane forest at elevations between 1,800 and 2,750 m (5,900 and 9,000 ft), though it only reaches 2,400 m (7,900 ft) in Peru.

== Behavior ==
=== Movement ===
The scimitar-winged piha is believed to be a year-round resident.

=== Feeding ===
The scimitar-winged piha is known to feed on berries and fruit and probably eats insects as well, but details are lacking. It has been observed in groups of three to five and in mixed-species feeding flocks.

=== Breeding ===
Nothing is known about the scimitar-winged piha's breeding biology.

=== Vocal and non-vocal sounds ===
The scimitar-winged piha sings during a "spiraling, falling" display flight, "a loud, piercing, high tseee'e'e'e'e tsueee? with three mechanically produced fft sounds at the start, middle, and end of [the] vocal phrase". Its calls are "an explosive chorus, loud, squeaky, conversational phrases, for example: PEEKsweeA'WEEK!".

== Status ==
The IUCN originally in 1988 assessed the scimitar-winged piha as being of Least Concern but since 2000 as Vulnerable. It has a limited range and its estimated population of between 600 and 1700 mature individuals is believed to be decreasing. "Road construction, low-intensity agriculture, selective logging and, at lower altitudes, clearance for plantations of tea, coffee and coca affect its habitat, although extensive areas of largely undisturbed forest remain...[c]limate change may cause a rapid reduction in range size within the next few decades." It is considered rare and localized in Peru but is found in several protected areas in Peru and Bolivia.
