= Jan Lindblad =

Swedish naturalist, writer, photographer, filmmaker and whistler (1932–1987)

Jan Victor Armas Lindblad (19 July 1932 – 5 April 1987) was a Swedish naturalist, writer, photographer, film maker, and whistling artist who imitated animals.

== Early life ==
Lindblad was born in Örebro, Sweden, in 1932. His dad, Frey, was a singing teacher, and taught Lindblad the fundamentals of music.

He made his debut in the early 1950s, performing in various revues, as a juggler and whistling artist. The latter talent made him one of the 1970s best-selling record artist in his native Sweden. One of his biggest hits was his whistling interpretation of the American folk song "Oh Shenandoah", recorded in 1977.

== Nature films ==
Lindblad was also known for his wildlife films, such as Ett vildmarksrike (A wildlife realm) of 1964; Guayana – vattnens land (Guyana – Land of the waters) of 1975; and Djungelbokens värld (The World of the Jungle Book) of 1980. In addition, he produced several nature films for television, including series from India and Latin America. Many of Lindblad's films were recorded as he stayed with indigenous people, for example in Guyana in 1964. For his nature films, Lindblad was awarded the Stora Journalistpriset award in 1970, and in 1980, he was awarded an honorary degree at Stockholm University.

== Photo journalism ==
Lindblad published several books on photo journalism, such as "Guayana - ett vildmarksrike" (1975) based on his TV series with the same name (not to be confused with the country of Guayana.) His photographs of Cuniculus paca, Felis pardalis, Morphnus guianensis and Glaucis hirsuta are considered world class and unique. In the preface, he writes>: "I will never forget the feeling when I for the first moment looked out on the tropical rainforest" and that impression would make him spend the coming ten years there.

== Activism ==
Lindblad was also an activist who fought against keeping wild animals in small cages; and known for his project of keeping two Bengal tiger cubs, named Lillan and Rani, in his Swedish residence. One of them ecaped which garnered quite a lot of attention as it entered a residential area.

Lindblad was a known diabetic but died suddenly in Stockholm of kidney failure related to a lingering tropical fever he had contracted in Sri Lanka. He was survived by his life partner and co-worker Pia Thörn and by Jan Lindblad, Jr., his son from a previous relationship.

In 1998, a series of two postage stamps, engraved by the accomplished postage stamp engraver Czesław Słania, was issued by the Swedish Postal Service with Lindblad and his two rather unusual pets, the tiger cubs Lillan and Rani.

His photography made a huge impact in Sweden and abroad and increased awareness about the fragility of nature, but he also received criticism for showing Native inhabitants' cruelty to animals, which he addressed in his book "Guayana - ett tropiskt vildmarksrike."
