= Boie's day gecko =

Scientific classification
- Kingdom: Animalia
- Phylum: Chordata
- Class: Reptilia
- Order: Squamata
- Suborder: Gekkota
- Family: Gekkonidae
- Genus: Cnemaspis
- Species: C. boiei

Binomial name
- Cnemaspis boiei (Gray, 1842)

Synonyms
- Goniodactylus Boeï Gray, 1842; Gonatodes boiei — Boulenger, 1885; Cnemaspis boiei — M.A. Smith, 1935

Species of lizard

Boie's day gecko (Cnemaspis boiei) is a species of lizard in the family Gekkonidae. The species is endemic to India.

== Etymology ==
C. boiei is named after Friedrich Boie (1789–1870) or his brother Heinrich Boie (1794–1827), German naturalists.

== Description ==
C. boiei may attain a snout-to-vent length (SVL) of almost 4 cm (1.6 in).

== Reproduction ==
C. boiei is oviparous.
