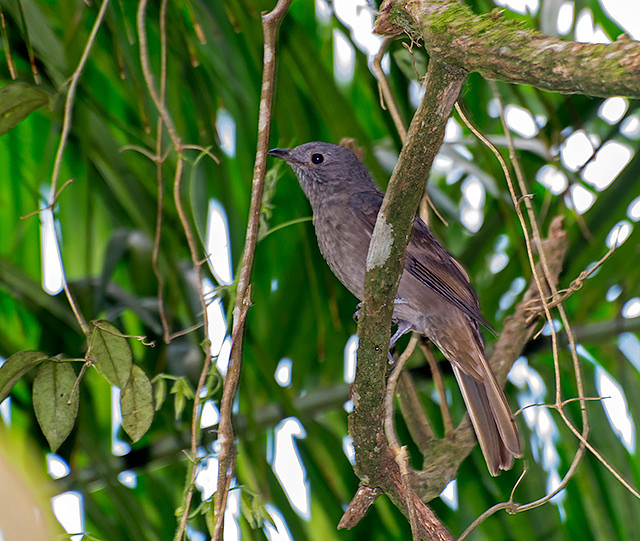

Conservation status
- Least Concern (IUCN 3.1)

Scientific classification
- Kingdom: Animalia
- Phylum: Chordata
- Class: Aves
- Order: Passeriformes
- Family: Cotingidae
- Genus: Lipaugus
- Species: L. lanioides

Binomial name
- Lipaugus lanioides (Lesson, 1844)

= Cinnamon-vented piha =

Species of bird

The cinnamon-vented piha (Lipaugus lanioides) is a species of bird in the family Cotingidae, the cotingas. It is endemic to Brazil.

== Taxonomy and systematics ==
The cinnamon-vented piha was originally described as Tardampelis lanoides. It was eventually moved to genus Lipaugus that was erected in 1828. The species is monotypic.

== Description ==
The cinnamon-vented piha is 25 to 28 cm (9.8 to 11 in) long and weighs 85 to 110 g (3.0 to 3.9 oz). The sexes have the same plumage. Adults have a mostly gray head and upperparts with a brownish wash and a slightly scaly crown. Their wings and tail are also gray with a darker brownish wash than on the upperparts. Their underparts are mostly pale grayish brown with thin whitish streaks and cinnamon-buff undertail coverts. They have a dark brown iris, a dark brown or blackish bill with a paler base to the mandible, and gray legs and feet.

== Distribution and habitat ==
The cinnamon-vented piha is found in southeastern Brazil from southeastern Bahia south to northeastern Santa Catarina. There are also a few isolated records inland from that band. The species inhabits humid montane forest, mostly at elevations between 500 and 1,000 m (1,600 and 3,300 ft). It occurs locally as high as 1,400 m (4,600 ft) and almost to sea level in the south of its range.

== Behavior ==
=== Movement ===
The cinnamon-vented piha is primarily a year-round resident but may make some elevational movements in the south of its range.

=== Feeding ===
The cinnamon-vented piha feeds primarily on fruits and also includes large insects in its diet; nestlings are fed only insects for approximately the first two weeks after hatch. It perches quietly and peers about before sidling or making sallies to take fruit or insects from leaves or branches.

=== Breeding ===
The cinnamon-vented piha's breeding season appears to span from September to March. A few nests are known; were small thin platforms made from twigs. Most were on horizontal twigs in a small tree about 7 to 8 m (23 to 26 ft) above the ground. One nest was on a dead palm leaf about 2.5 m (8 ft) above the ground. The clutch size is one egg that is olive green with brown spots. The female alone appears to incubate. The incubation period is about 26 days and fledging occurs 25 to 26 days after hatch. Other details of parental care are not known.

=== Vocalization ===
The cinnamon-vented piha's song is a "low, calm, nasal, staccato tu-téhtjuh or tutu-téhtjutju" whose middle note is higher than the others.

== Status ==
The IUCN originally in 1988 assessed the cinnamon-vented piha as Threatened, then in 1994 as Vulnerable, in 2004 as Near Threatened, and since 2022 as being of Least Concern. It has a somewhat limited and fragmented range; its estimated population of at least 50,000 mature individuals is believed to be decreasing. "The most significant threat is the extensive destruction and fragmentation of Atlantic forest throughout its range, caused by conversion for agriculture, human settlements and logging." Despite the large population estimated by the IUCN, other sources consider it rare. It appears to occupy only about 10% of its former range. It does occur in several protected areas.
