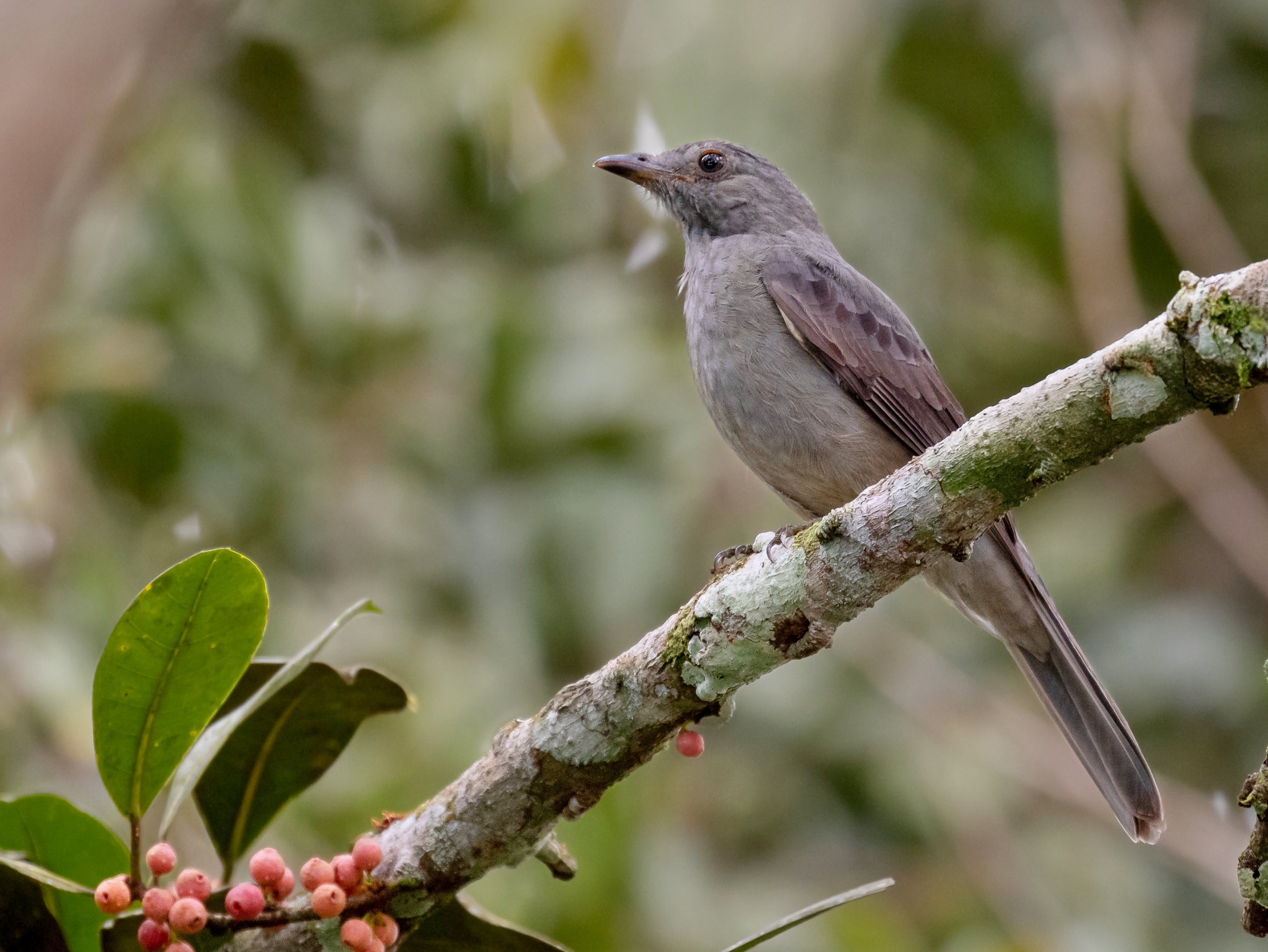
- Manaus, Amazonas, Brazil

Conservation status
- Least Concern (IUCN 3.1)

Scientific classification
- Kingdom: Animalia
- Phylum: Chordata
- Class: Aves
- Order: Passeriformes
- Family: Cotingidae
- Genus: Lipaugus
- Species: L. vociferans

Binomial name
- Lipaugus vociferans (Wied, 1820)

Audio
- Song recorded in Tambopata Reserve, Madre de Dios Region, Peru

= Screaming piha =

Species of bird

Individuals vocalizing

The screaming piha (Lipaugus vociferans) is a species of passerine bird in the family Cotingidae, the cotingas. It is found throughout mainland South America, excluding in Argentina, Chile, Paraguay, and Uruguay.

== Taxonomy and systematics ==
The screaming piha has a complicated taxonomic history. It was originally described as Ampelis cinerea but that binomial was already in use for the pompadour cotinga (now named Xipholena punicea). The oldest available name was Muscicapa vociferans, with which Weid mistakenly placed it in the Old World flycatcher family. It was moved to genus Lipaugus in 1828 by Boie who erected that genus for it (but spelled it Lipangus because of mis-reading the name's Greek origin).

The screaming piha is monotypic.

== Description ==
The screaming piha is 24 to 26 cm (9.4 to 10 in) long and weighs 68 to 87 g (2.4 to 3.1 oz). The sexes have the same plumage. Adults have medium gray upperparts. Their tail and their wings' flight feathers and greater coverts are browner or duskier. Their underparts are a paler gray that is palest on the throat. They have a brown, grayish brown, or gray iris, a black maxilla and a dusky mandible with a pinkish dusky base. Their legs and feet are highly variable with colors that include dark shades of green, brown, gray, and black. Juveniles resemble adults but with cinnamon rufous wing coverts and tips of the tail feathers.

== Distribution and habitat ==
The screaming piha has a disjunct distribution: widespread throughout the Amazon rainforest, as well as the Atlantic Forest (Pernambuco and Bahia coastal forests).

The screaming piha inhabits lowland evergreen forest, primarily terra firme but also locally igapó and várzea flooded forest. In elevation it ranges from sea level to 500 m (1,600 ft) in Brazil. It reaches 1,400 m (4,600 ft) in Venezuela though most records there are below 900 m (3,000 ft). It reaches 600 m (2,000 ft) in Colombia, 500 m (1,600 ft) in Ecuador, and 1,150 m (3,800 ft) in Peru.

== Behavior ==
=== Movement ===
The screaming piha is a year-round resident.

=== Feeding ===
Despite its abundance and very large range, the screaming piha's diet is poorly known. It feeds on fruit and insects whose relative proportions are thought to vary seasonally. It has been observed feeding on many species of Ficus figs, on members of several other plant families, on Lepidoptera caterpillars, Orthoptera, and other insects, and once on a small lizard. It regurgitates large fruit seeds. The species typically forages singly in the forest's mid-story, taking fruit with a sally from a perch. It occasionally joins mixed-species feeding flocks.

=== Breeding ===
The screaming piha's breeding season has not been determined. Males gather at leks to attract females; typically up to about 10 males are present but leks with 30 have been observed. They apparently court females only vocally, as no physical displays have been observed. The species' nests are "untidy collections of thin twigs, tendrils, or vine" typically found about 7 or 8 m (23 or 26 ft) above the ground.

=== Vocalization ===
"[The] Screaming Piha is famous for its characteristic qui, qui, yo call, which is audible through up to 400 m of rainforest" and is preceded by two or three fainter groo notes. The song exceeds 110 decibels at one meter, which "translated for human ears [has] a value of loudness between 'discomfort' and 'pain' ". This loudness is thought to be second only to that of the white bellbird (Procnias albus) among birds. The screaming piha has additional vocalizations including "loud mewing TOWW notes, often in a series, and various random piercing squeaks, whistles, and moans". It vocalizes year-round, usually from a perch in the forest's understory to mid-story, and often shifts perches between bouts. During the song the male tips vigorously forward and back.

== Status ==
The IUCN has assessed the screaming piha as being of Least Concern. It has an extremely large range; its population size is not known and is believed to be decreasing. No immediate threats have been identified. "The Screaming Piha is considered highly vulnerable to human disturbance" and the "Atlantic Forest subpopulations may be at greater risk" than those in Amazonia.
