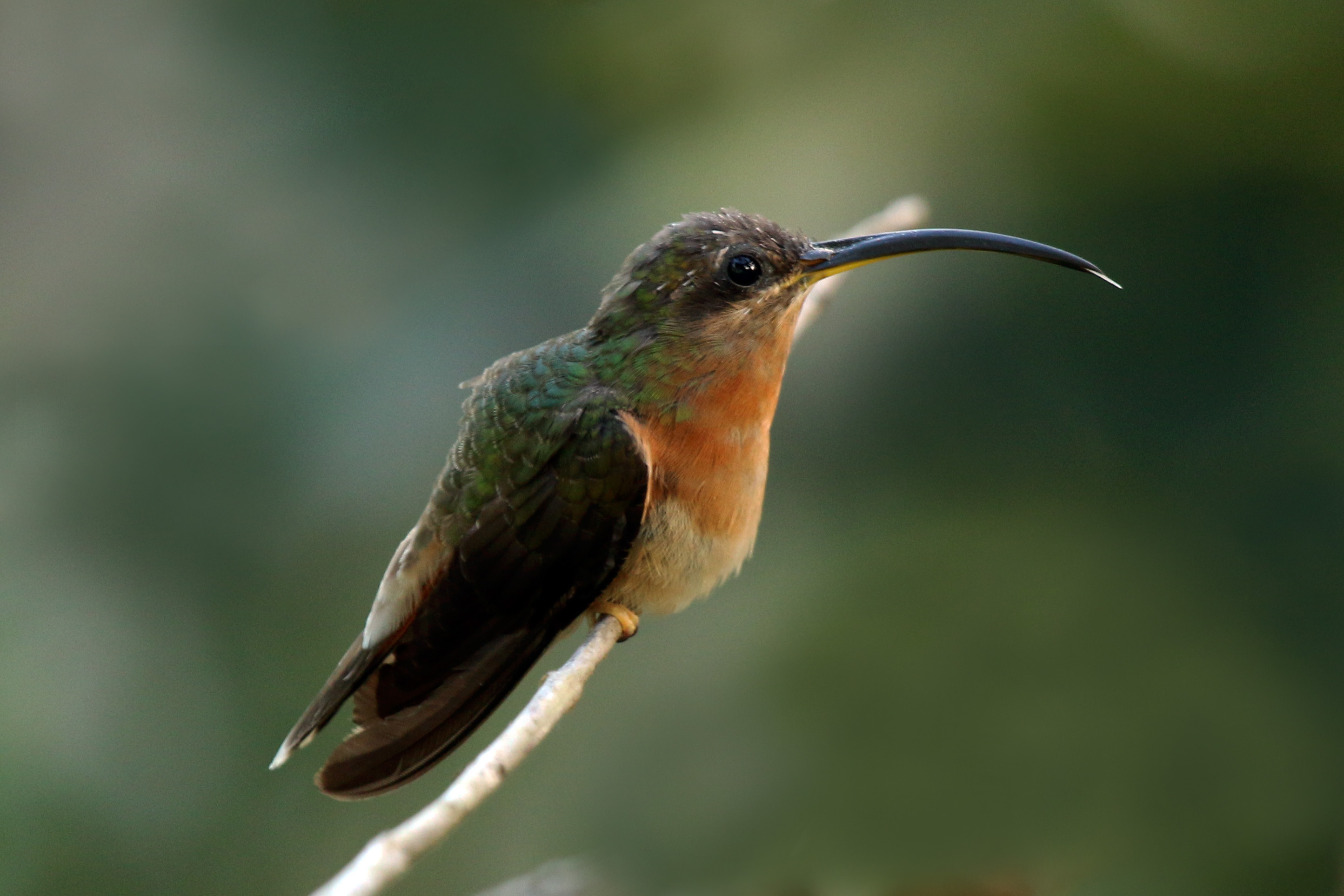
- G. h. insularum, Tobago

Conservation status
- Least Concern (IUCN 3.1)
- CITES Appendix II

Scientific classification
- Kingdom: Animalia
- Phylum: Chordata
- Class: Aves
- Clade: Strisores
- Order: Apodiformes
- Family: Trochilidae
- Genus: Glaucis
- Species: G. hirsutus

Binomial name
- Glaucis hirsutus (Gmelin, JF, 1788)

Synonyms
- Glaucis hirsuta (Gmelin, 1788: lapsus); Glaucis hirsutus abrawayae Ruschi, 1973; Threnetes grzimeki Ruschi, 1973

= Rufous-breasted hermit =

Species of hummingbird

The rufous-breasted hermit or hairy hermit (Glaucis hirsutus) is a hummingbird that breeds from Panama south to Bolivia, and on Trinidad, Tobago and Grenada. It is a widespread and generally common species, though local populations may change in numbers and disappear altogether in marginal habitat.

== Taxonomy ==
The rufous-breasted hermit was formally described in 1788 by the German naturalist Johann Friedrich Gmelin in his revised and expanded edition of Carl Linnaeus's Systema Naturae. He placed it with all the other hummingbirds in the genus Trochilus and coined the binomial name Trochilus hirsutus. Gmelin's description was based on that of the German naturalist Georg Marcgrave in his Historia Naturalis Brasiliae that had been published 140 years earlier in 1648. The rufous-breasted hermit is now placed with two other species in the genus Glaucis that was introduced in 1831 by the German zoologist Friedrich Boie. The genus name is from the Ancient Greek glaukos meaning "blue-grey", "glaucous" or "pale green". The specific epithet hirsutus is Latin meaning "hairy" or "bristled". The type locality is northeast Brazil.

Two subspecies are recognised:

- G. h. insularum Hellmayr & Seilern, 1913 – Grenada, Trinidad and Tobago
- G. h. hirsutus (Gmelin, JF, 1788) – Panama and west Colombia through Venezuela and the Guianas to Brazil and north Bolivia

== Description ==
The rufous-breasted hermit is 10.7 cm (4.2 in) long and weighs 7 g (0.25 oz) on average. The bill measures around 3.3 cm (1.3 in) and is strongly decurved, long and thin – though compared to the bills of other hummingbirds, it is rather robust. The rufous-breasted hermit has a brownish head, bronze-green upperparts and rufous underparts. The tail has green central feathers and rufous outer feathers, all tipped white. The bill has a yellow lower mandible and a black upper mandible. Sexes are similar, but the male has yellow streaking on the upper mandible, and the female may be slightly duller in plumage. The bill of females is also proportionally a bit shorter (though this is hardly recognizable) and more decurved (which is quite conspicuous in direct comparison).

Males are somewhat more distinct, resembling a barbthroat (Threnetes). They were once described as a distinct species, the "black barbthroat" ("T. grzimeki"). Similarly, the proposed subspecies abrawayae is apparently based on individual variation occurring in adults and not taxonomically distinct either.

The call of this species is a high-pitched sweet.

== Behavior and ecology ==
This hermit inhabits forest undergrowth, often near running water. The rufous-breasted hermit's food is nectar, taken from a variety of understory flowers, and some small invertebrates.

=== Food and feeding ===
G. hirsutus has very discriminating feeding habits. It will only visit flowers whose corolla length and curvature precisely matches that of its bill, while most other hummingbirds are far more flexible. Thus, its foodplants are found across almost the entire diversity of angiosperms. Very popular with this bird are Zingiberales, such as Costus scaber (Costaceae), or Heliconia standleyi and Heliconia stricta (Heliconiaceae). Other well-liked foodplants of this hummingbird include Gentianales like Duroia hirsuta, Palicourea lasiantha, Psychotria bahiensis and Psychotria platypoda (Rubiaceae), Lamiales such as Sanchezia peruviana (Acanthaceae) or Drymonia semicordata (Gesneriaceae), and Myrtales like Cuphea melvilla (Lythraceae). Even congeneric plants with flowers of slightly different length and curvature are avoided on the other hand.

Given the difference in bill curvature between males and females, it seems likely that the sexes avoid competing for the same food resource by visiting different plants, but there has been little in-depth study. Whether there has been any coevolution between the hairy hermit and its foodplants is more difficult to determine, but if anything, it seems to be less widespread than it could be presumed. Most plants visited by this hummingbird are also pollinated by less discriminating species. But for some (such as Cuphea melvilla, Psychotria bahiensis and P. platypoda) the hairy hermit seems to be a pollinator of crucial importance, indicating that – though less often than the characteristic bill shape suggests – strong mutualisms between this bird and some of its foodplants do indeed exist.

=== Breeding ===
The female rufous-breasted hermit lays two eggs in a small cup nest with a tail, made of rootlets and attached to the underside of a palm, fern or Heliconia leaf one or two meters (3–6 ft) above ground or so. The eggs are always two - never more nor less. The weight of each is 0.3 grammes. They both fit inside a male wedding ring, as documented by photographer Jan Lindblad. The nests are often near a stream, waterfall or roadside, and are surprisingly easy to find. Incubation is 17 days with 23 more to fledging, and this species may nest up to four times in a season. The male of this aggressive and inquisitive hummingbird helps to build and defend the nest, but does not incubate the eggs. At least regionally (e.g. in Colombia), the species breeds all year.

== Sources ==
- Faria, Christiana M.A.; Rodrigues, Marcos; do Amaral, Frederico Q.; Módena, Érica & Fernandes, Alexandre M. (2006): Aves de um fragmento de Mata Atlântica no alto Rio Doce, Minas Gerais: colonização e extinção [The birds of an Atlantic Forest fragment at upper Rio Doce valley, Minas Gerais, southeastern Brazil: colonization and extinction]. Revista Brasileira de Zoologia 23(4): 1217–1230 [Portuguese with English abstract]. doi:10.1590/S0101-81752006000400032 PDF fulltext
- Greeney, Harold F.; Gelis, Rudolphe A. & White, Richard (2004): Notes on breeding birds from an Ecuadorian lowland forest. Bull. B.O.C. 124(1): 28–37. PDF fulltext
- Mallet-Rodrigues, Francisco (2006): Táxons de aves de validade questionável com ocorrência no Brasil. III – Trochilidae (I) [Questionable bird taxa with occurrence in Brazil. III – Trochilidae (I)]. Revista Brasileira de Ornitologia 14(4): 475–479 [Portuguese with English abstract]. PDF fulltext
- Rodríguez-Flores, Claudia Isabel & Stiles, F. Gary (2005): Análisis ecomorfológico de una comunidad de colibríes ermitaños (Trochilidae, Phaetorninae) y sus flores en la Amazonia colombiana. [Ecomorphological analysis of a community of hermit hummingbirds (Trochilidae, Phaethorninae) and their flowers in Colombian Amazonia]. Ornitología Colombiana 3: 7–27 [Spanish with English abstract]. PDF fulltext
