= Friedrich Boie =

German scientist

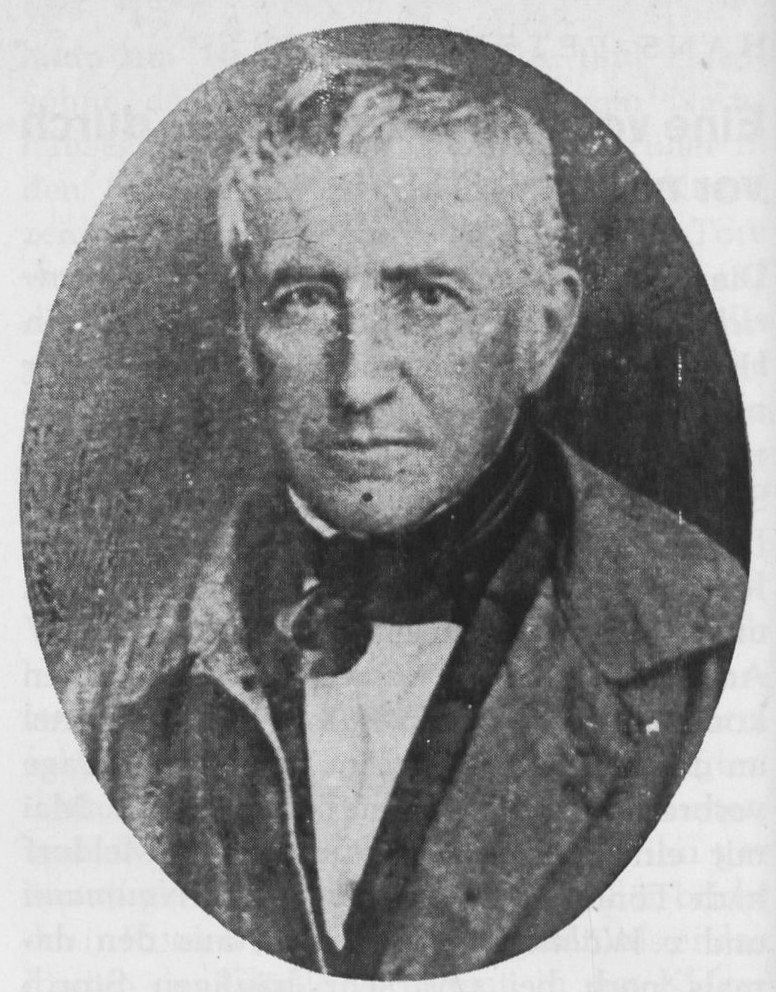
Friedrich Boie

Friedrich Boie (4 June 1789 – 3 March 1870) was a German entomologist, herpetologist, ornithologist, and lawyer. He was born at Meldorf in Holstein and died at Kiel. Friedrich Boie was the brother of Heinrich Boie.

In 1860, Friedrich Boie was elected a Member of the German Academy of Sciences Leopoldina.

Friedrich Boie was the author of Bemerkungen über Merrem's Versuch eines Systems der Amphibien (Isis von Oken 1827) and Auszüge aus dem System der Ornithologie (Isis von Oken 1844).

Friedrich Boie was the author of several new species and new genera of birds including the hummingbird genus Glaucis, the swallow genus Progne, the cuckooshrike genus Pericrocotus, the passerine genus Lipaugus, the owl genus Athene, and the cuckoo genus Chrysococcyx. Also, he and his brother Heinrich, working together, described about 50 new species of reptiles.

A species of Indian gecko, Cnemaspis boiei, is named in honor of Friedrich Boie or his brother Heinrich Boie.
