= Cephaloleia varabilis =

Scientific classification
- Kingdom: Animalia
- Phylum: Arthropoda
- Class: Insecta
- Order: Coleoptera
- Suborder: Polyphaga
- Infraorder: Cucujiformia
- Family: Chrysomelidae
- Genus: Cephaloleia
- Species: C. varabilis

Binomial name
- Cephaloleia varabilis Staines, 1996

Species of beetle

Cephaloleia varabilis is a species of rolled-leaf beetle in the family Chrysomelidae, first found in Colombia and Panama.
