= Cephaloleia viltata =

Scientific classification
- Kingdom: Animalia
- Phylum: Arthropoda
- Class: Insecta
- Order: Coleoptera
- Suborder: Polyphaga
- Infraorder: Cucujiformia
- Family: Chrysomelidae
- Genus: Cephaloleia
- Species: C. viltata

Binomial name
- Cephaloleia viltata Staines, 1996

Species of beetle

Cephaloleia viltata is a species of rolled-leaf beetle in the family Chrysomelidae, first found in Costa Rica.
