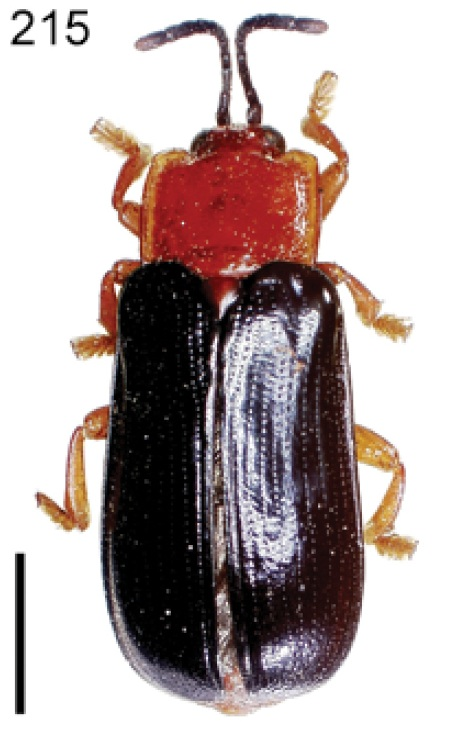

Scientific classification
- Kingdom: Animalia
- Phylum: Arthropoda
- Class: Insecta
- Order: Coleoptera
- Suborder: Polyphaga
- Infraorder: Cucujiformia
- Family: Chrysomelidae
- Genus: Cephaloleia
- Species: C. princeps

Binomial name
- Cephaloleia princeps Baly, 1858

= Cephaloleia princeps =

Species of beetle

Cephaloleia princeps is a species of beetle of the family Chrysomelidae. It is found in Colombia, Ecuador and Peru.

== Description ==
Adults reach a length of about 11–11.7 mm. The head, pronotum, scutellum, venter and legs are reddish, while the eyes and antennae are black and the elytron is greenish-black.
