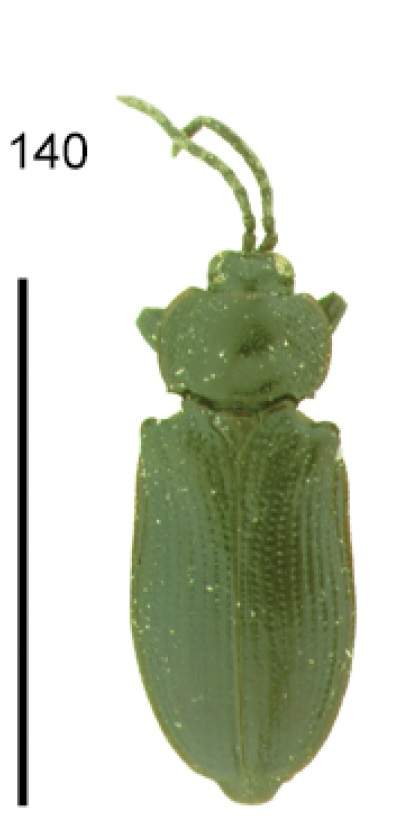

Scientific classification
- Kingdom: Animalia
- Phylum: Arthropoda
- Clade: Pancrustacea
- Class: Insecta
- Order: Coleoptera
- Suborder: Polyphaga
- Infraorder: Cucujiformia
- Family: Chrysomelidae
- Genus: Cephaloleia
- Species: C. fiebrigi

Binomial name
- Cephaloleia fiebrigi Uhmann, 1936

= Cephaloleia fiebrigi =

Species of beetle

Cephaloleia fiebrigi is a species of beetle of the family Chrysomelidae. It is found in Argentina, Brazil (Matto Grosso) and Paraguay.

== Description ==
Adults reach a length of about 3.3–3.7 mm. Adults are black, with the lateral margin of the pronotum, elytron and tarsi brownish.
