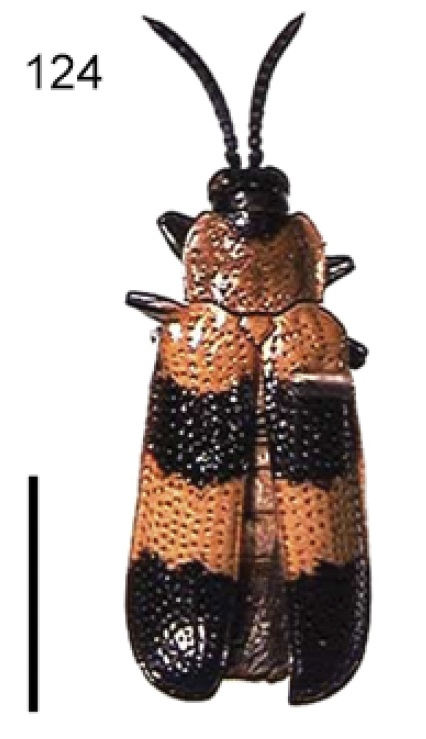

Scientific classification
- Kingdom: Animalia
- Phylum: Arthropoda
- Class: Insecta
- Order: Coleoptera
- Suborder: Polyphaga
- Infraorder: Cucujiformia
- Family: Chrysomelidae
- Genus: Cephaloleia
- Species: C. disjuncta

Binomial name
- Cephaloleia disjuncta Staines, 1998

= Cephaloleia disjuncta =

Species of beetle

Cephaloleia disjuncta is a species of beetle of the family Chrysomelidae. It is found in Costa Rica.

== Description ==
Adults reach a length of about 6.9 mm. Adults are yellowish-brown with the head and antennae black. The pronotum is yellowish-brown with a black medial macula and the elytron is yellowish-brown with a transverse black band. The apical one-third is also black.

== Biology ==
This species has been collected from Vitex copperi.
