= Cephaloleia simoni =

Scientific classification
- Kingdom: Animalia
- Phylum: Arthropoda
- Class: Insecta
- Order: Coleoptera
- Suborder: Polyphaga
- Infraorder: Cucujiformia
- Family: Chrysomelidae
- Genus: Cephaloleia
- Species: C. simoni

Binomial name
- Cephaloleia simoni Pic, 1934

Species of beetle

Cephaloleia simoni is a species of beetle of the family Chrysomelidae. It is found in Venezuela.

== Description ==
Adults reach a length of about 5 mm. Adults are testaceous, the pronotum with a brownish disc and the head darker posteriorly. The elytral disc is greenish-brown and the venter and legs are testaceous.
