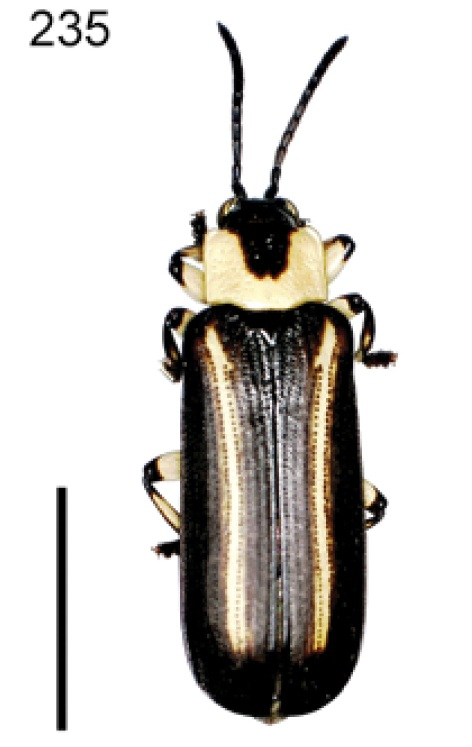

Scientific classification
- Kingdom: Animalia
- Phylum: Arthropoda
- Class: Insecta
- Order: Coleoptera
- Suborder: Polyphaga
- Infraorder: Cucujiformia
- Family: Chrysomelidae
- Genus: Cephaloleia
- Species: C. separata

Binomial name
- Cephaloleia separata Baly, 1885

= Cephaloleia separata =

Species of beetle

Cephaloleia separata is a species of beetle of the family Chrysomelidae. It is found in Costa Rica and Mexico.

== Description ==
Adults reach a length of about 6.2–6.7 mm. The head and scutellum are brownish, the antennae are black and the pronotum is yellowish with the anterior margin dark behind the head. The elytron is brownish-black with a yellow vitta.
