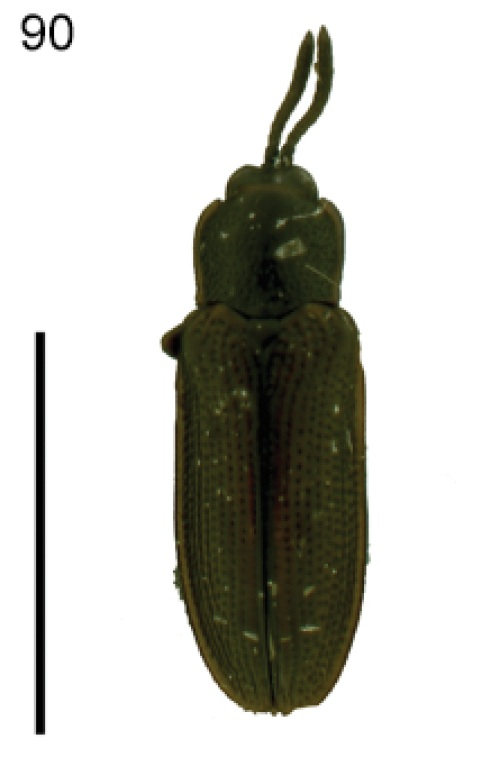

Scientific classification
- Kingdom: Animalia
- Phylum: Arthropoda
- Clade: Pancrustacea
- Class: Insecta
- Order: Coleoptera
- Suborder: Polyphaga
- Infraorder: Cucujiformia
- Family: Chrysomelidae
- Genus: Cephaloleia
- Species: C. brunnea

Binomial name
- Cephaloleia brunnea Staines, 1996

= Cephaloleia brunnea =

Species of beetle

Cephaloleia brunnea is a species of rolled-leaf beetle in the family Chrysomelidae, first found in Trinidad.

== Description ==
Adults reach a length of about 4–4.1 mm. Adults are brown, with the pronotum and head slightly darker than the elytron. The latter with darker suture.
