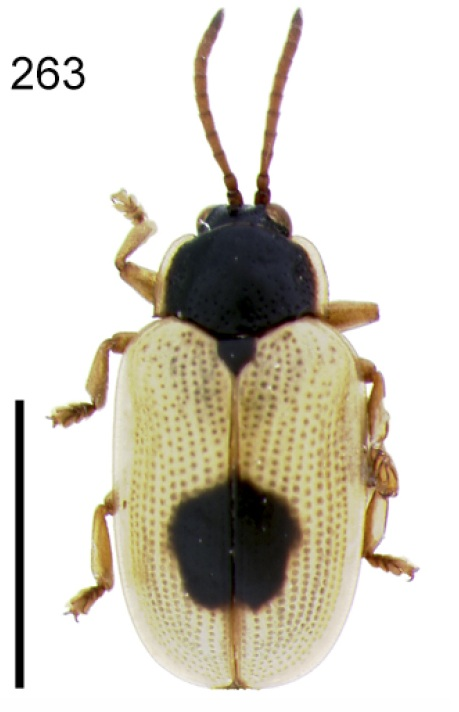

Scientific classification
- Kingdom: Animalia
- Phylum: Arthropoda
- Class: Insecta
- Order: Coleoptera
- Suborder: Polyphaga
- Infraorder: Cucujiformia
- Family: Chrysomelidae
- Genus: Cephaloleia
- Species: C. uniguttata

Binomial name
- Cephaloleia uniguttata Pic, 1923

= Cephaloleia uniguttata =

Species of beetle

Cephaloleia uniguttata is a species of beetle of the family Chrysomelidae. It is found in Ecuador and Peru.

== Description ==
Adults reach a length of about 5 mm. Adults are black, while the pronotum is red laterally and the elytron is reddish-yellow with a large rounded black sutural macula after the middle. The legs and abdomen are both red.
