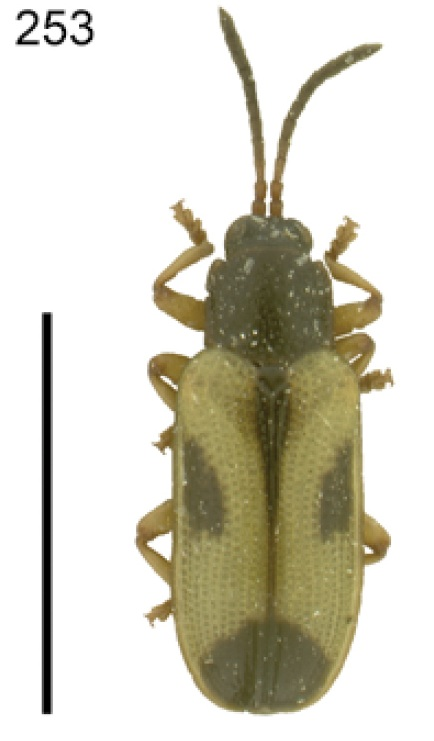

Scientific classification
- Kingdom: Animalia
- Phylum: Arthropoda
- Class: Insecta
- Order: Coleoptera
- Suborder: Polyphaga
- Infraorder: Cucujiformia
- Family: Chrysomelidae
- Genus: Cephaloleia
- Species: C. thiemei

Binomial name
- Cephaloleia thiemei Weise, 1910

= Cephaloleia thiemei =

Species of beetle

Cephaloleia thiemei is a species of beetle of the family Chrysomelidae. It is found in Argentina and Brazil (Amazonas) and Ecuador.

== Description ==
Adults reach a length of about 3.8–4.2 mm. Adults are yellowish with darker markings. The legs are reddish-yellow and the antennae are black (except antennomeres 1–3 or 1–4, which are reddish). The head, pronotum and scutellum are black and the elytron has a darkened suture and transverse black macula apically.
