= Cephaloleia amblys =

Scientific classification
- Kingdom: Animalia
- Phylum: Arthropoda
- Class: Insecta
- Order: Coleoptera
- Suborder: Polyphaga
- Infraorder: Cucujiformia
- Family: Chrysomelidae
- Genus: Cephaloleia
- Species: C. amblys

Binomial name
- Cephaloleia amblys Staines, 1996

Species of beetle

Cephaloleia amblys is a species of rolled-leaf beetle in the family Chrysomelidae. It is found in Panama.

== Description ==
Adults reach a length of about 3.4 mm. Adults are brownish, with the head and pronotum darker.
