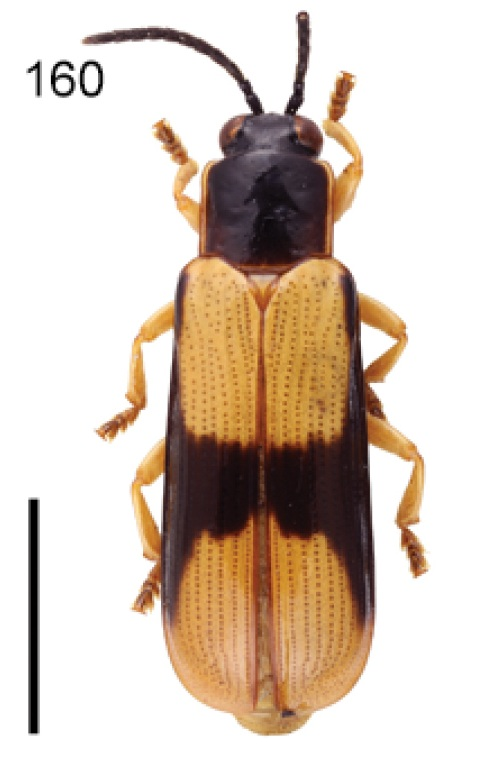

Scientific classification
- Kingdom: Animalia
- Phylum: Arthropoda
- Class: Insecta
- Order: Coleoptera
- Suborder: Polyphaga
- Infraorder: Cucujiformia
- Family: Chrysomelidae
- Genus: Cephaloleia
- Species: C. h-nigrum

Binomial name
- Cephaloleia h-nigrum Pic, 1923

= Cephaloleia h-nigrum =

Species of beetle

Cephaloleia h-nigrum is a species of beetle of the family Chrysomelidae. It is found in Ecuador. The name was originally misspelled as "Hnigrum" (without a hyphen) and some sources retain this misspelling (e.g.,).

== Description ==
Adults reach a length of about 5.4–5.9 mm. Adults are yellowish-brown, while the antennae and head are black. The pronotum is black with pale lateral margins and elytron has a lateral black vitta and a medial black macula. The legs are yellowish-brown.
