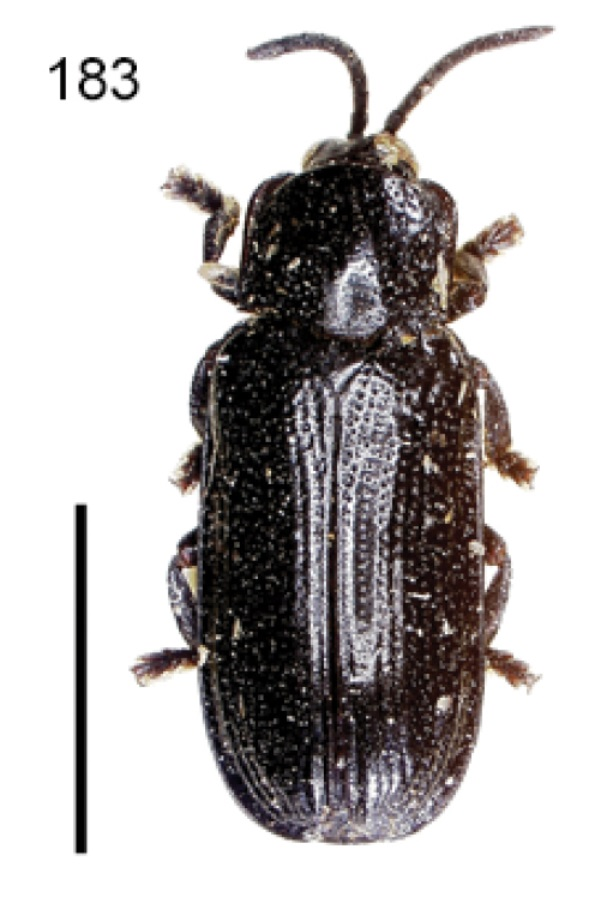

Scientific classification
- Kingdom: Animalia
- Phylum: Arthropoda
- Class: Insecta
- Order: Coleoptera
- Suborder: Polyphaga
- Infraorder: Cucujiformia
- Family: Chrysomelidae
- Genus: Cephaloleia
- Species: C. marantae

Binomial name
- Cephaloleia marantae Uhmann, 1957

= Cephaloleia marantae =

Species of beetle

Cephaloleia marantae is a species of beetle of the family Chrysomelidae. It is found in Argentina, Bolivia, Brazil (Amazonas, Paraná, Rio Grande do Sul, São Paulo, Santa Catharina) and Paraguay.

== Description ==
Adults reach a length of about 5–5.9 mm. Adults are black.
