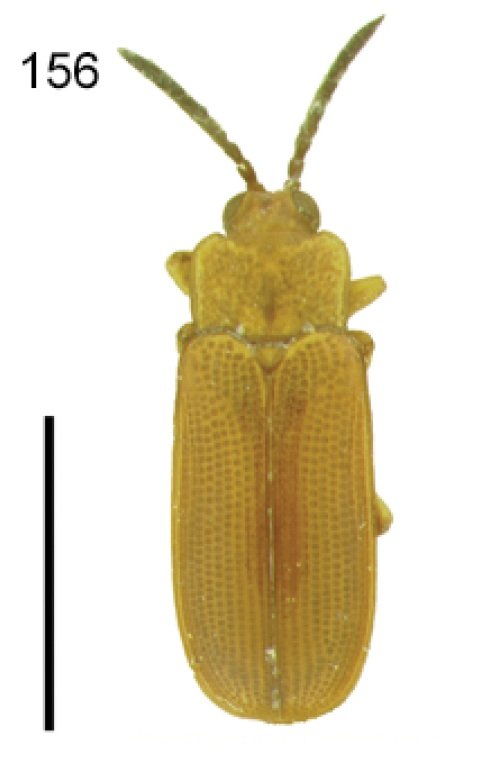

Scientific classification
- Kingdom: Animalia
- Phylum: Arthropoda
- Clade: Pancrustacea
- Class: Insecta
- Order: Coleoptera
- Suborder: Polyphaga
- Infraorder: Cucujiformia
- Family: Chrysomelidae
- Genus: Cephaloleia
- Species: C. halli

Binomial name
- Cephaloleia halli Uhmann, 1951

= Cephaloleia halli =

Species of beetle

Cephaloleia halli is a species of beetle of the family Chrysomelidae. It is found in Brazil (Bahia, Parana, Rondonia) and Ecuador.

== Description ==
Adults reach a length of about 5–5.4 mm. Adults are reddish-brown, with the eyes and apical antennomeres darker.
