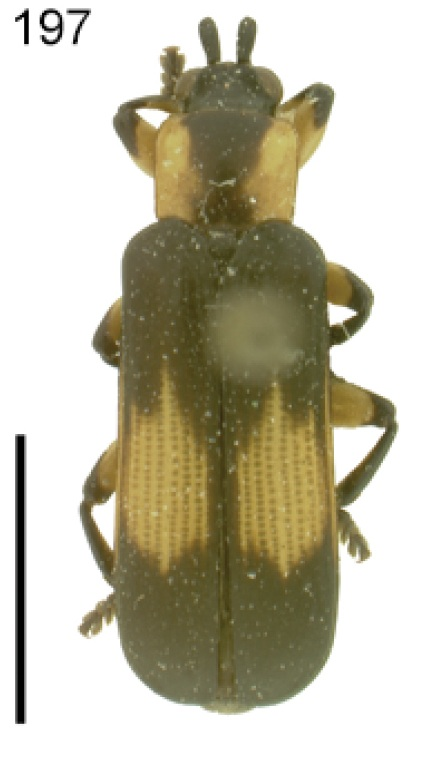

Scientific classification
- Kingdom: Animalia
- Phylum: Arthropoda
- Class: Insecta
- Order: Coleoptera
- Suborder: Polyphaga
- Infraorder: Cucujiformia
- Family: Chrysomelidae
- Genus: Cephaloleia
- Species: C. nubila

Binomial name
- Cephaloleia nubila Weise, 1905

= Cephaloleia nubila =

Species of beetle

Cephaloleia nubila is a species of beetle of the family Chrysomelidae. It is found in Brazil and Ecuador.

== Description ==
Adults reach a length of about 6.5–7 mm. Adults are black with a submedial pronotal macula, and the elytron with a wide yellowish submedial transverse vitta. The antennae are dark, with the last three antennomeres yellowish.
