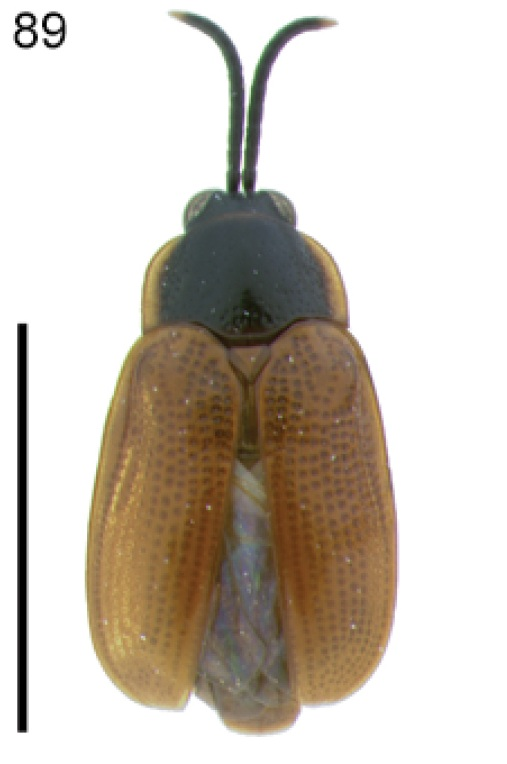

Scientific classification
- Kingdom: Animalia
- Phylum: Arthropoda
- Class: Insecta
- Order: Coleoptera
- Suborder: Polyphaga
- Infraorder: Cucujiformia
- Family: Chrysomelidae
- Genus: Cephaloleia
- Species: C. brevis

Binomial name
- Cephaloleia brevis Staines, 2014

= Cephaloleia brevis =

Species of beetle

Cephaloleia brevis is a species of beetle of the family Chrysomelidae. It is found in French Guiana.

== Description ==
Adults reach a length of about 4 mm. They have a black head, while antennomeres 1–2 are reddish-brown, 3–10 are black and 11 is black basally and pale apically. The pronotum is black with pale lateral margins. The elytron is castaneous and the legs are yellowish-brown.

== Etymology ==
The species name is derived from Latin brevis (meaning short or narrow) and refers to the short, stubby appearance of this species.
