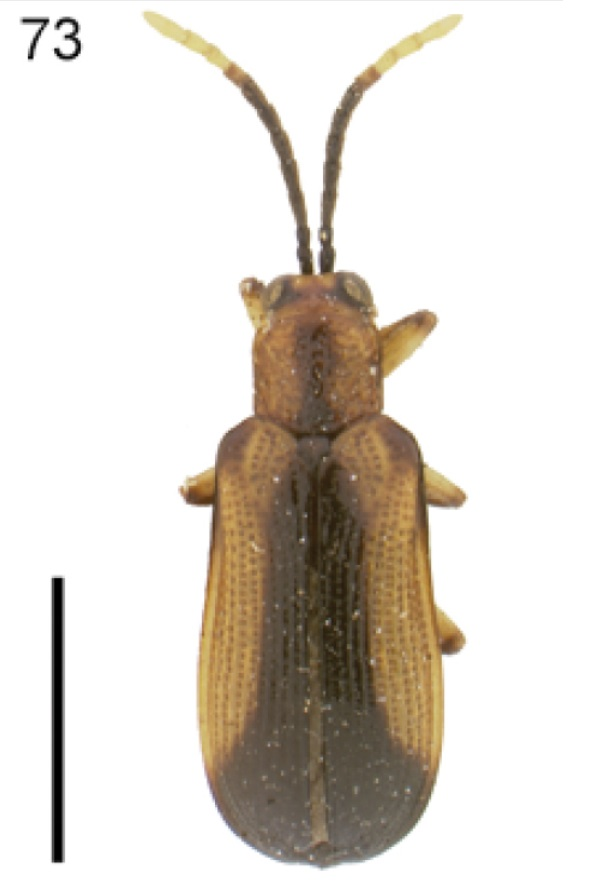

Scientific classification
- Kingdom: Animalia
- Phylum: Arthropoda
- Clade: Pancrustacea
- Class: Insecta
- Order: Coleoptera
- Suborder: Polyphaga
- Infraorder: Cucujiformia
- Family: Chrysomelidae
- Genus: Cephaloleia
- Species: C. antennata

Binomial name
- Cephaloleia antennata Waterhouse, 1881

= Cephaloleia antennata =

Species of beetle

Cephaloleia antennata is a species of beetle of the family Chrysomelidae. It is found in Brazil (Amazonas), Ecuador and Peru.

== Description ==
Adults reach a length of about 6.5–7.1 mm. Adults are reddish-yellow, with antennomeres 1–7, a medial line on the pronotum, scutellum, and elytral suture and humeri darker. The head has a blackish band on the vertex. Antennomeres 8–11 are yellow.
