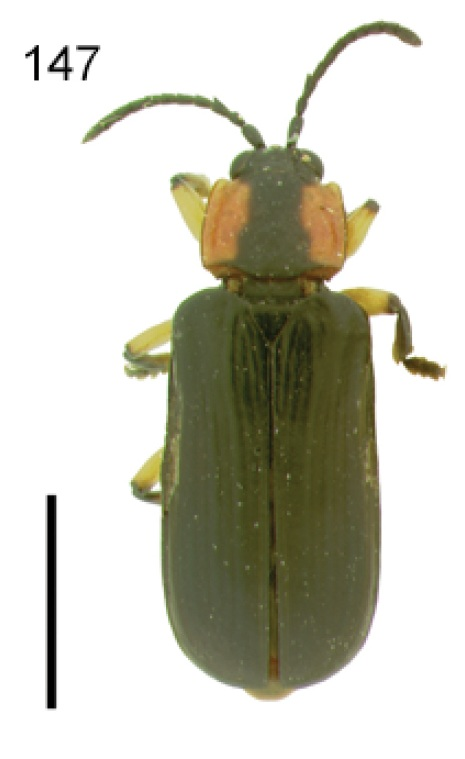

Scientific classification
- Kingdom: Animalia
- Phylum: Arthropoda
- Class: Insecta
- Order: Coleoptera
- Suborder: Polyphaga
- Infraorder: Cucujiformia
- Family: Chrysomelidae
- Genus: Cephaloleia
- Species: C. fulvicollis

Binomial name
- Cephaloleia fulvicollis Weise, 1910

= Cephaloleia fulvicollis =

Species of beetle

Cephaloleia fulvicollis is a species of beetle in the family Chrysomelidae. It is found in Costa Rica and Mexico.

== Description ==
Adults reach a length of about 6–7.8 mm. Adults are blackish-blue with reddish yellow markings.

== Biology ==
Adults have been collected on Heliconia stilesii.
