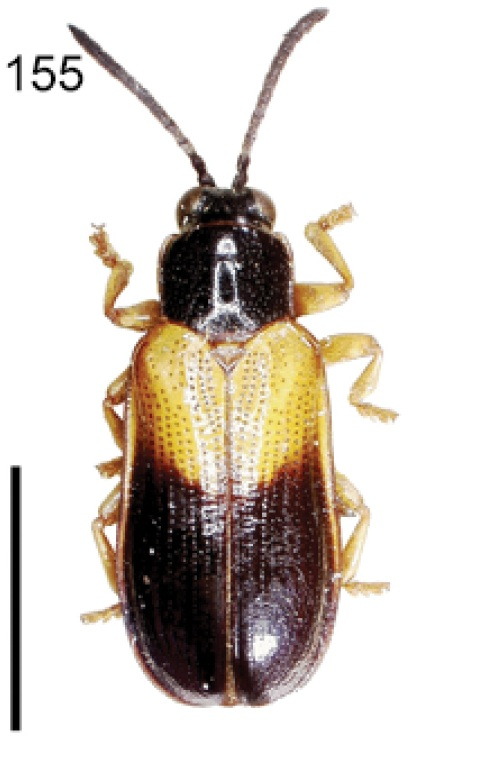

Scientific classification
- Kingdom: Animalia
- Phylum: Arthropoda
- Class: Insecta
- Order: Coleoptera
- Suborder: Polyphaga
- Infraorder: Cucujiformia
- Family: Chrysomelidae
- Genus: Cephaloleia
- Species: C. grayei

Binomial name
- Cephaloleia grayei Baly, 1858

= Cephaloleia grayei =

Species of beetle

Cephaloleia grayei is a species of beetle of the family Chrysomelidae. It is found in Bolivia, Brazil (Bahia, Minas Gerais, Rondonia), Ecuador and Peru.

== Description ==
Adults reach a length of about 6–6.5 mm. The head, pronotum, scutellum and apical half of the elytron are black, while the basal portion of the latter is yellowish.
