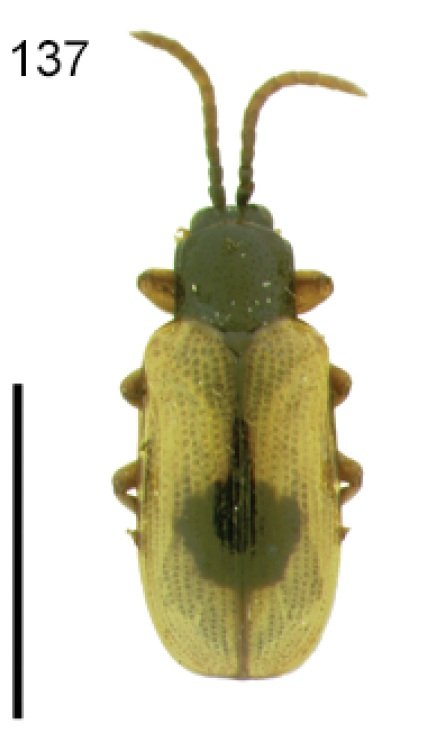

Scientific classification
- Kingdom: Animalia
- Phylum: Arthropoda
- Class: Insecta
- Order: Coleoptera
- Suborder: Polyphaga
- Infraorder: Cucujiformia
- Family: Chrysomelidae
- Genus: Cephaloleia
- Species: C. fasciata

Binomial name
- Cephaloleia fasciata Weise, 1904

= Cephaloleia fasciata =

Species of beetle

Cephaloleia fasciata is a species of beetle in the family Chrysomelidae. It is found in Colombia and Venezuela.

== Description ==
Adults reach a length of about 4.2–4.5 mm. The head, pronotum and venter are black, while the basal antennomeres are reddish and the palps, legs and abdomen are reddish-yellow. The elytron is yellowish with the suture, humeral macula and a transverse band black.
