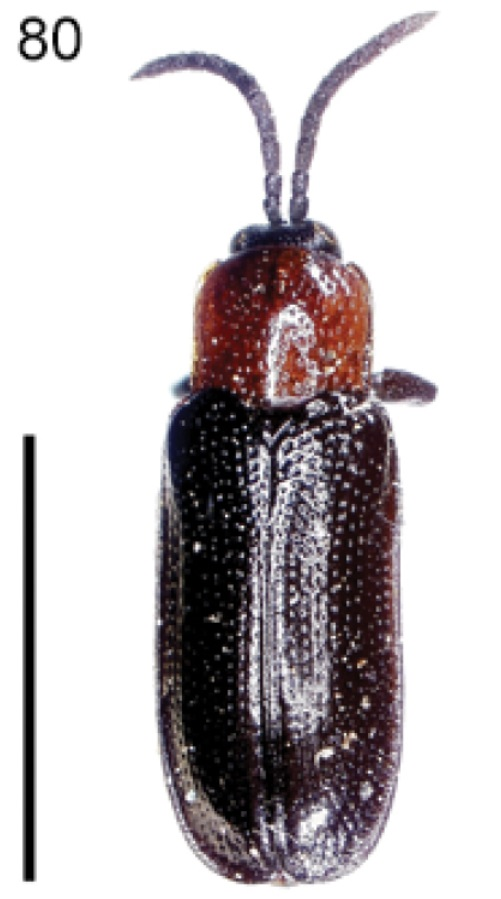

Scientific classification
- Kingdom: Animalia
- Phylum: Arthropoda
- Clade: Pancrustacea
- Class: Insecta
- Order: Coleoptera
- Suborder: Polyphaga
- Infraorder: Cucujiformia
- Family: Chrysomelidae
- Genus: Cephaloleia
- Species: C. atriceps

Binomial name
- Cephaloleia atriceps Pic, 1926

= Cephaloleia atriceps =

Species of beetle

Cephaloleia atriceps is a species of beetle of the family Chrysomelidae. It is found in Costa Rica and Mexico.

== Description ==
Adults reach a length of about 4–4.4 mm. Adults are black, while the pronotum, prosternum and claws are red.
