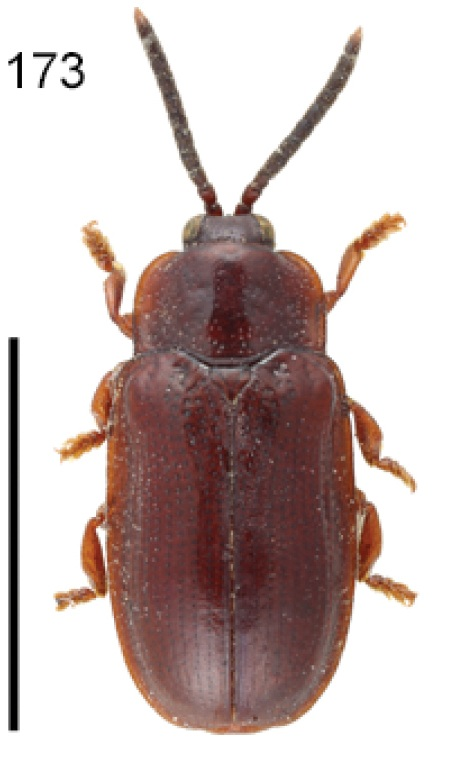

Scientific classification
- Kingdom: Animalia
- Phylum: Arthropoda
- Class: Insecta
- Order: Coleoptera
- Suborder: Polyphaga
- Infraorder: Cucujiformia
- Family: Chrysomelidae
- Genus: Cephaloleia
- Species: C. latipennis

Binomial name
- Cephaloleia latipennis Pic, 1928

= Cephaloleia latipennis =

Species of beetle

Cephaloleia latipennis is a species of beetle of the family Chrysomelidae. It is found in Bolivia, Ecuador and Peru.

== Description ==
Adults reach a length of about 3.9–4.1 mm. Adults are dark reddish-brown, with the eyes and antennae black (except for the basal 2 antennomeres).
