= Cephaloleia bondari =

Scientific classification
- Kingdom: Animalia
- Phylum: Arthropoda
- Clade: Pancrustacea
- Class: Insecta
- Order: Coleoptera
- Suborder: Polyphaga
- Infraorder: Cucujiformia
- Family: Chrysomelidae
- Genus: Cephaloleia
- Species: C. bondari

Binomial name
- Cephaloleia bondari Monrós, 1945

Synonyms
- Himatidium mauliki Bondar, 1942 (preocc.); Stilpnaspis bondari

Species of beetle

Cephaloleia bondari is a species of beetle of the family Chrysomelidae. It is found in Brazil (Bahia, Pernambuco).

== Biology ==
This species has been collected from Heliconia segun.
