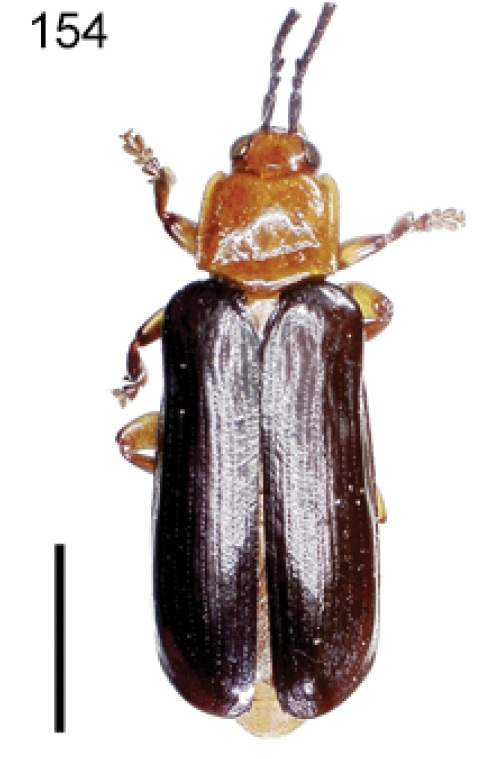

Scientific classification
- Kingdom: Animalia
- Phylum: Arthropoda
- Clade: Pancrustacea
- Class: Insecta
- Order: Coleoptera
- Suborder: Polyphaga
- Infraorder: Cucujiformia
- Family: Chrysomelidae
- Genus: Cephaloleia
- Species: C. gratiosa

Binomial name
- Cephaloleia gratiosa Baly, 1858

Synonyms
- Cephaloleia gratiosa nigripennis Weise, 1905; Cephaloleia unicolor Weise, 1905; Cephalolia beckeri Weise, 1905

= Cephaloleia gratiosa =

Species of beetle

Cephaloleia gratiosa is a species of beetle in the family Chrysomelidae. It is found in Costa Rica, Mexico and Panama.

== Description ==
Adults reach a length of about 9.1–10.3 mm. Adults are variable in colour, sometimes reddish-brown with black eyes and black central maculae on the apical half of the elytron or with a black head, antennae and elytra, and a reddish brown pronotum, er even totally reddish brown.

== Biology ==
Adults have been collected off flowers of Heliconia bourgaeana.
