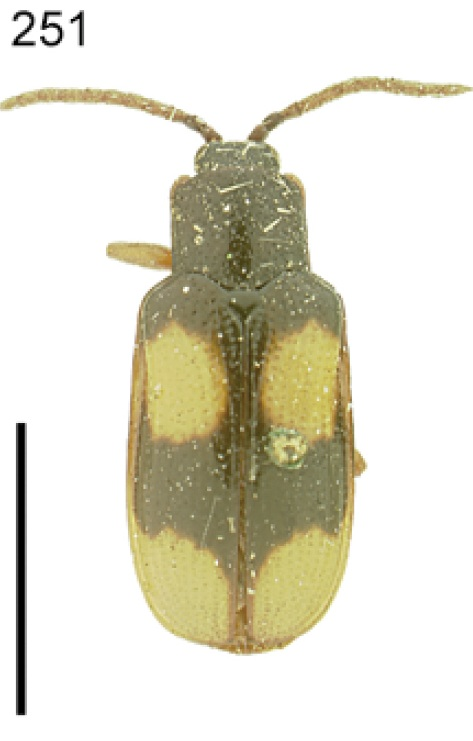

Scientific classification
- Kingdom: Animalia
- Phylum: Arthropoda
- Clade: Pancrustacea
- Class: Insecta
- Order: Coleoptera
- Suborder: Polyphaga
- Infraorder: Cucujiformia
- Family: Chrysomelidae
- Genus: Cephaloleia
- Species: C. tetraspilota

Binomial name
- Cephaloleia tetraspilota Guérin-Méneville, 1844

= Cephaloleia tetraspilota =

Species of beetle

Cephaloleia tetraspilota is a species of beetle of the family Chrysomelidae. It is found in Colombia, Ecuador and Peru.

== Description ==
Adults reach a length of about 5–5.7 mm. Adults are black, while the antennae and legs are paler. The elytron has a rounded ocher-yellow macula behind the humeri and the apical one-fourth is ocher-yellow.

== Biology ==
Adults have been collected feeding on Calathea lanata.
