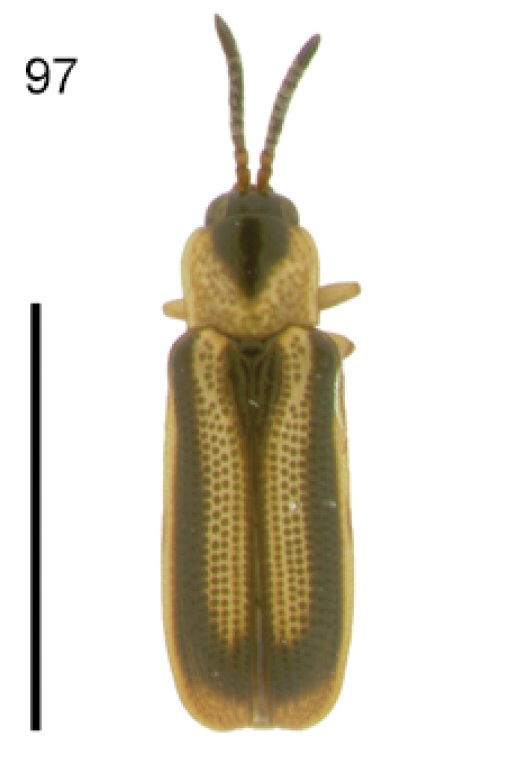

Scientific classification
- Kingdom: Animalia
- Phylum: Arthropoda
- Class: Insecta
- Order: Coleoptera
- Suborder: Polyphaga
- Infraorder: Cucujiformia
- Family: Chrysomelidae
- Genus: Cephaloleia
- Species: C. chica

Binomial name
- Cephaloleia chica Staines, 2014

= Cephaloleia chica =

Species of beetle

Cephaloleia chica is a species of beetle of the family Chrysomelidae. It is found in Peru.

== Description ==
Adults reach a length of about 3.9 mm. The head, scutellum, and antennae (except the basal two antennomeres which are paler) are black and the pronotum is yellow with a black triangular macula behind the head. The elytron is black with the lateral and apical margins yellow and a yellow vitta from the basal margin to apical one-third on puncture rows 2–5.

== Etymology ==
The species name is derived from Spanish chico (meaning little or little one) and refers to the small size of this species.
