= Cephaloleia basalis =

Scientific classification
- Kingdom: Animalia
- Phylum: Arthropoda
- Class: Insecta
- Order: Coleoptera
- Suborder: Polyphaga
- Infraorder: Cucujiformia
- Family: Chrysomelidae
- Genus: Cephaloleia
- Species: C. basalis

Binomial name
- Cephaloleia basalis (Weise, 1910)

Synonyms
- Demotispa basalis Weise, 1910

Species of beetle

Cephaloleia basalis is a species of beetle of the family Chrysomelidae. It is found in Brazil.
