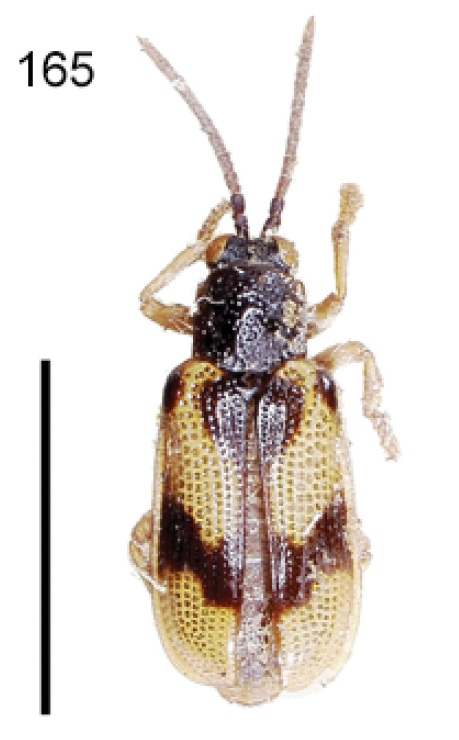

Scientific classification
- Kingdom: Animalia
- Phylum: Arthropoda
- Class: Insecta
- Order: Coleoptera
- Suborder: Polyphaga
- Infraorder: Cucujiformia
- Family: Chrysomelidae
- Genus: Cephaloleia
- Species: C. insidiosa

Binomial name
- Cephaloleia insidiosa Pic, 1923

= Cephaloleia insidiosa =

Species of beetle

Cephaloleia insidiosa is a species of beetle in the family Chrysomelidae. It is found in Ecuador.

== Description ==
Adults reach a length of about 3.9–4.3 mm. The head and pronotum are black, while the legs and apex of the abdomen are red. The elytron is testaceous with a black macula at the base near the humerus, a second macula near the basal margin and a medial black shallow V-shaped transverse band. The antennae are yellowish-brown.
