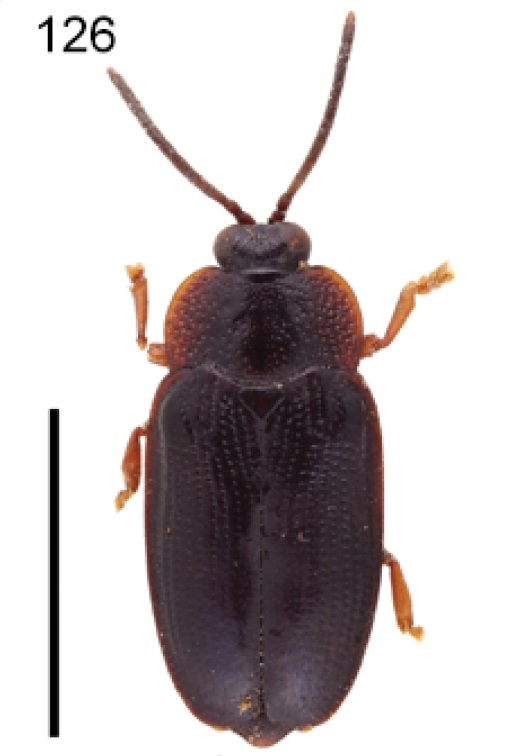

Scientific classification
- Kingdom: Animalia
- Phylum: Arthropoda
- Class: Insecta
- Order: Coleoptera
- Suborder: Polyphaga
- Infraorder: Cucujiformia
- Family: Chrysomelidae
- Genus: Cephaloleia
- Species: C. donckieri

Binomial name
- Cephaloleia donckieri Pic, 1926

= Cephaloleia donckieri =

Species of beetle

Cephaloleia donckieri is a species of beetle of the family Chrysomelidae. It is found in French Guiana and Suriname.

== Description ==
Adults reach a length of about 4.8–5.3 mm. The head and pronotum are black, while the elytron is bluish. The antennae (at the base), pronotum (laterally), elytra (at humeri), legs and body are red.
