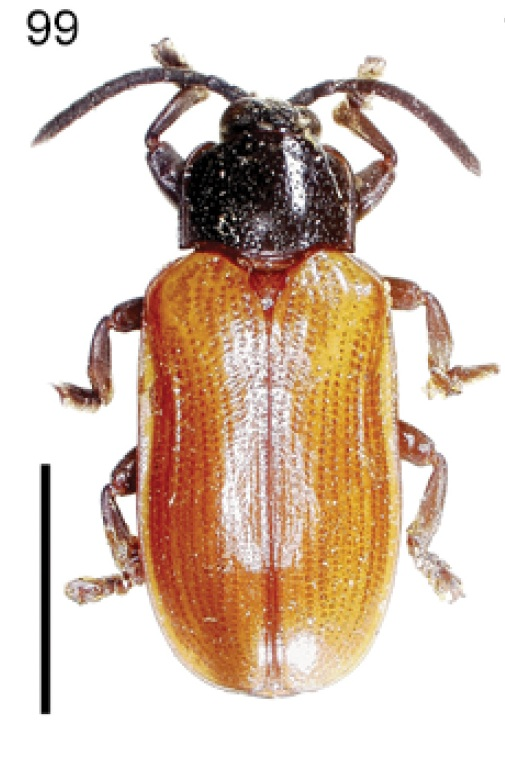

Scientific classification
- Kingdom: Animalia
- Phylum: Arthropoda
- Class: Insecta
- Order: Coleoptera
- Suborder: Polyphaga
- Infraorder: Cucujiformia
- Family: Chrysomelidae
- Genus: Cephaloleia
- Species: C. clarkella

Binomial name
- Cephaloleia clarkella Baly, 1858

= Cephaloleia clarkella =

Species of beetle

Cephaloleia clarkella is a species of beetle of the family Chrysomelidae. It is found in Bolivia, Brazil, Ecuador and Peru.

== Description ==
Adults reach a length of about 7.1–7.5 mm. The head, antennae, pronotum and legs are black, while the scutellum and elytron are yellowish.
