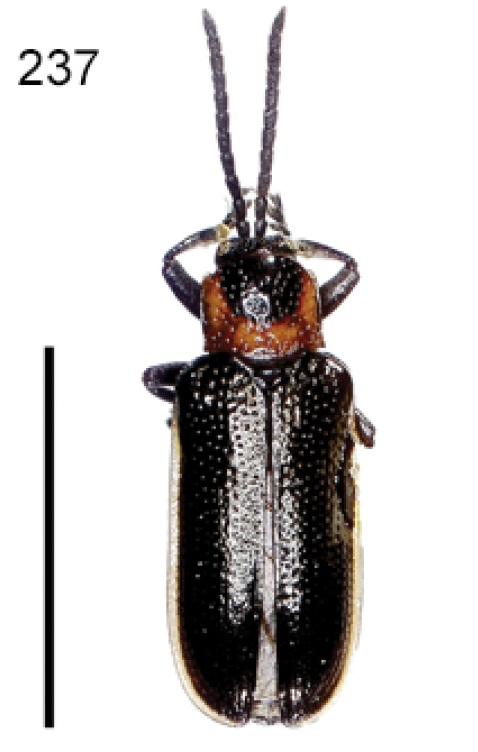

Scientific classification
- Kingdom: Animalia
- Phylum: Arthropoda
- Class: Insecta
- Order: Coleoptera
- Suborder: Polyphaga
- Infraorder: Cucujiformia
- Family: Chrysomelidae
- Genus: Cephaloleia
- Species: C. splendida

Binomial name
- Cephaloleia splendida Staines, 1996

= Cephaloleia splendida =

Species of beetle

Cephaloleia splendida is a species of rolled-leaf beetle in the family Chrysomelidae. It is found in Costa Rica, Nicaragua and Panama.

== Description ==
Adults reach a length of about 3.9–4.3 mm. Adults are shining black (except for the yellow elytral lateral margins). The pronotum is reddish-yellow except for a black rectangular black macula from the anterior margin to the disc behind the head.
