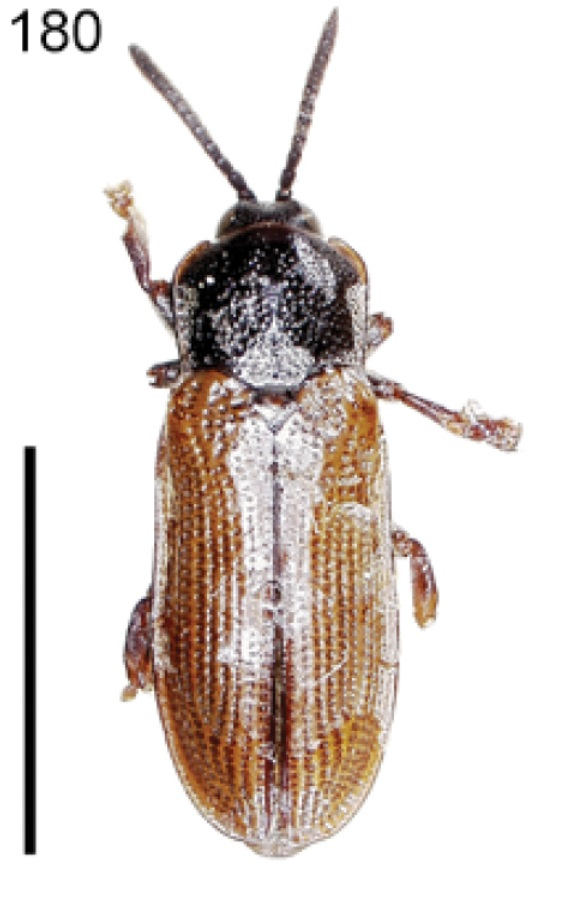

Scientific classification
- Kingdom: Animalia
- Phylum: Arthropoda
- Class: Insecta
- Order: Coleoptera
- Suborder: Polyphaga
- Infraorder: Cucujiformia
- Family: Chrysomelidae
- Genus: Cephaloleia
- Species: C. luridipennis

Binomial name
- Cephaloleia luridipennis (Weise, 1905)

Synonyms
- Stenispa luridipennis Weise, 1905

= Cephaloleia luridipennis =

Species of beetle

Cephaloleia luridipennis is a species of beetle of the family Chrysomelidae. It is found in Brazil (Bahia, Rondonia), Paraguay, Peru and Venezuela.

== Description ==
Adults reach a length of about 4.7–5 mm. The head is dark with a metallic sheen. The pronotum is black with reddish lateral margins. The scutellum is black with a reddish middle and the elytron is yellowish-brown with the suture and apex darker.

== Biology ==
Adults have been collected on Cyperaceae species.
