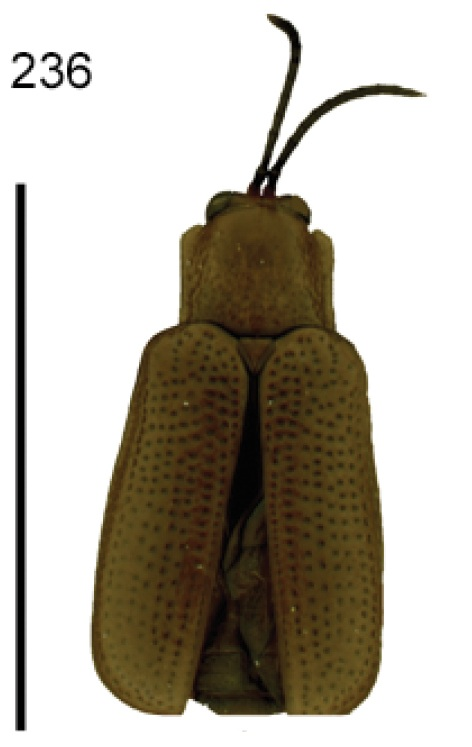

Scientific classification
- Kingdom: Animalia
- Phylum: Arthropoda
- Class: Insecta
- Order: Coleoptera
- Suborder: Polyphaga
- Infraorder: Cucujiformia
- Family: Chrysomelidae
- Genus: Cephaloleia
- Species: C. simplex

Binomial name
- Cephaloleia simplex Staines, 2008

= Cephaloleia simplex =

Species of beetle

Cephaloleia simplex is a species of beetle of the family Chrysomelidae. It is found in Dominica and Grenada.

== Description ==
Adults reach a length of about 3 mm. Adults are yellowish-brown, with the eyes and antennae (except for the basal antennomere) nearly black. The venter is brownish except for the black pro- and mesosterna.
