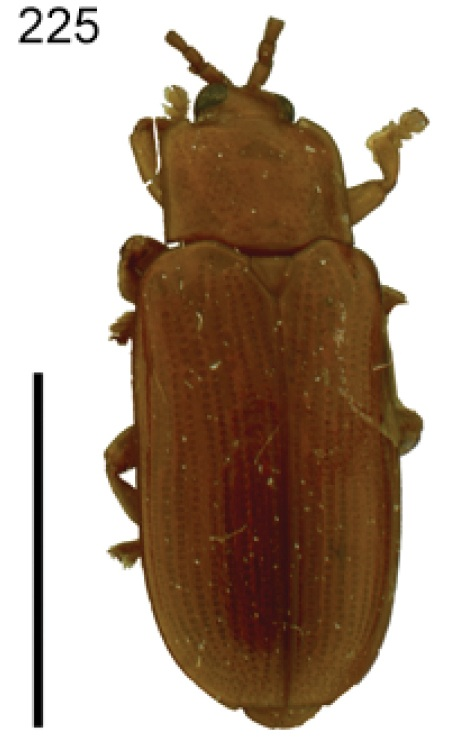

Scientific classification
- Kingdom: Animalia
- Phylum: Arthropoda
- Clade: Pancrustacea
- Class: Insecta
- Order: Coleoptera
- Suborder: Polyphaga
- Infraorder: Cucujiformia
- Family: Chrysomelidae
- Genus: Cephaloleia
- Species: C. rubra

Binomial name
- Cephaloleia rubra Staines, 1996

= Cephaloleia rubra =

Species of beetle

Cephaloleia rubra is a species of rolled-leaf beetle in the family Chrysomelidae. It is found in Trinidad.

== Description ==
Adults reach a length of about 5–6 mm. Adults are reddish-brown, with the eyes and apex of the antennae blackish.
