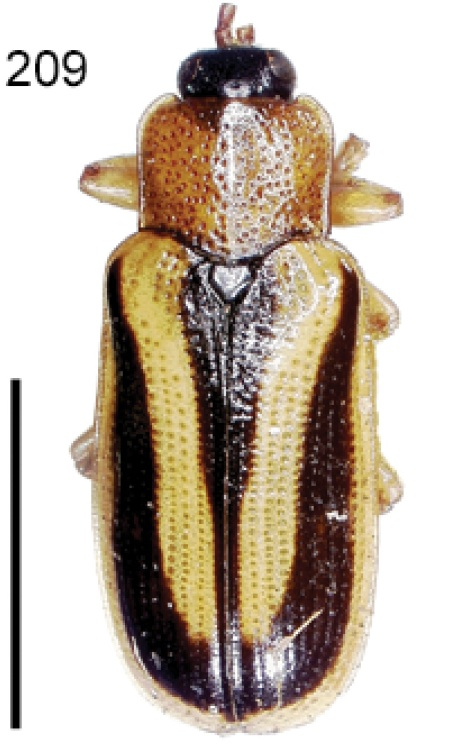

Scientific classification
- Kingdom: Animalia
- Phylum: Arthropoda
- Clade: Pancrustacea
- Class: Insecta
- Order: Coleoptera
- Suborder: Polyphaga
- Infraorder: Cucujiformia
- Family: Chrysomelidae
- Genus: Cephaloleia
- Species: C. picta

Binomial name
- Cephaloleia picta Baly, 1858

Synonyms
- Cephaloleia picta interrupta Uhmann, 1951

= Cephaloleia picta =

Species of beetle

Cephaloleia picta is a species of beetle of the family Chrysomelidae. It is found in Argentina, Brazil (Bahia, Santa Catharina) and Paraguay.

== Description ==
Adults reach a length of about 5.1–5.8 mm. The head, antennae (except antennomeres 1–4 which are yellowish) and scutellum are black, while the pronotum is yellow and the elytron is black with a yellow lateral margin and a broad yellow subsutural vitta which reaches to beyond middle and connects to the lateral margin.
