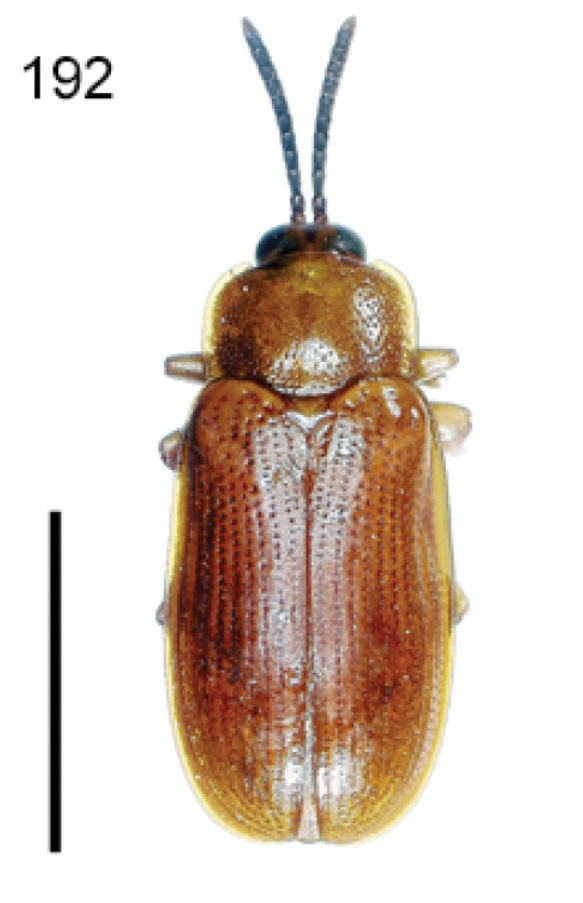

Scientific classification
- Kingdom: Animalia
- Phylum: Arthropoda
- Class: Insecta
- Order: Coleoptera
- Suborder: Polyphaga
- Infraorder: Cucujiformia
- Family: Chrysomelidae
- Genus: Cephaloleia
- Species: C. nigriceps

Binomial name
- Cephaloleia nigriceps Baly, 1869

= Cephaloleia nigriceps =

Species of beetle

Cephaloleia nigriceps is a species of beetle of the family Chrysomelidae. It is found in Brazil (Amazonas, Bahia, Rondonia) and Peru.

== Description ==
Adults reach a length of about 5.3–5.8 mm. Adults are reddish-yellow, with the head and antennae are darker.
