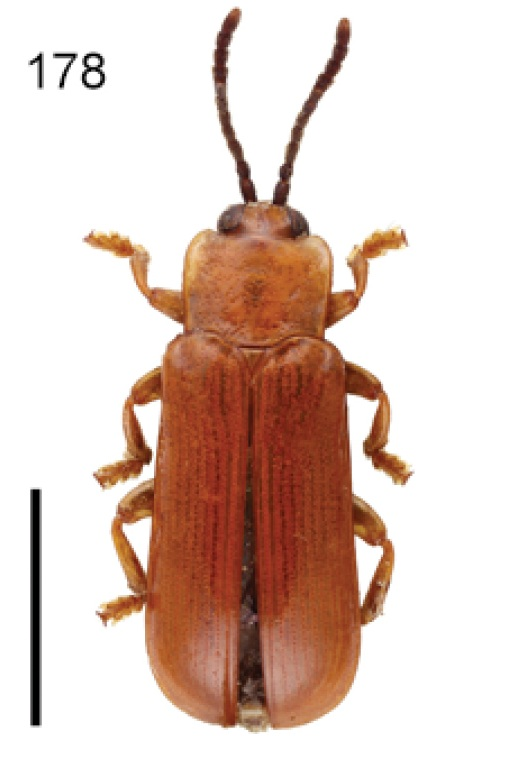

Scientific classification
- Kingdom: Animalia
- Phylum: Arthropoda
- Class: Insecta
- Order: Coleoptera
- Suborder: Polyphaga
- Infraorder: Cucujiformia
- Family: Chrysomelidae
- Genus: Cephaloleia
- Species: C. lojaensis

Binomial name
- Cephaloleia lojaensis Pic, 1931

= Cephaloleia lojaensis =

Species of beetle

Cephaloleia lojaensis is a species of beetle of the family Chrysomelidae. It is found in Ecuador.

== Description ==
Adults reach a length of about 6.9–7 mm. Adults are yellowish-red, with the eyes and antennae black.
