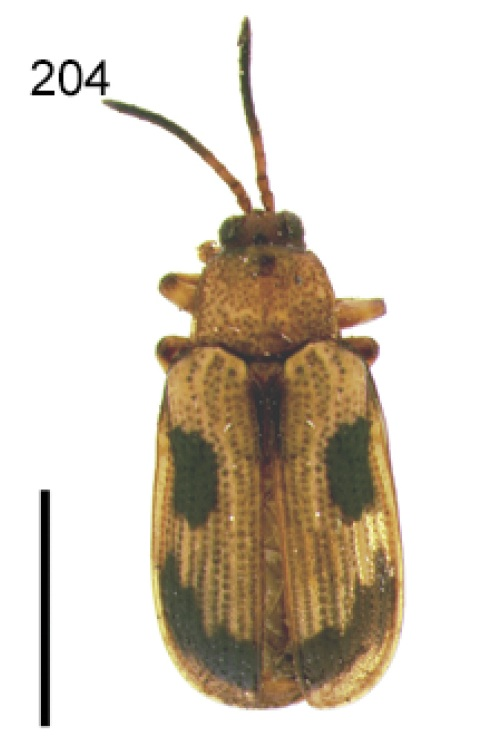

Scientific classification
- Kingdom: Animalia
- Phylum: Arthropoda
- Class: Insecta
- Order: Coleoptera
- Suborder: Polyphaga
- Infraorder: Cucujiformia
- Family: Chrysomelidae
- Genus: Cephaloleia
- Species: C. ornatula

Binomial name
- Cephaloleia ornatula Donckier, 1899

= Cephaloleia ornatula =

Species of beetle

Cephaloleia ornatula is a species of beetle of the family Chrysomelidae. It is found in Brazil (São Paulo).

== Description ==
Adults reach a length of about 6.2–6.5 mm. The head is black with a red vertex. Antennomeres 1–4 are red, while 5–11 are black. The pronotum has a slightly darker basal margin and there is a black macula on each elytron behind the humerus and apex.
