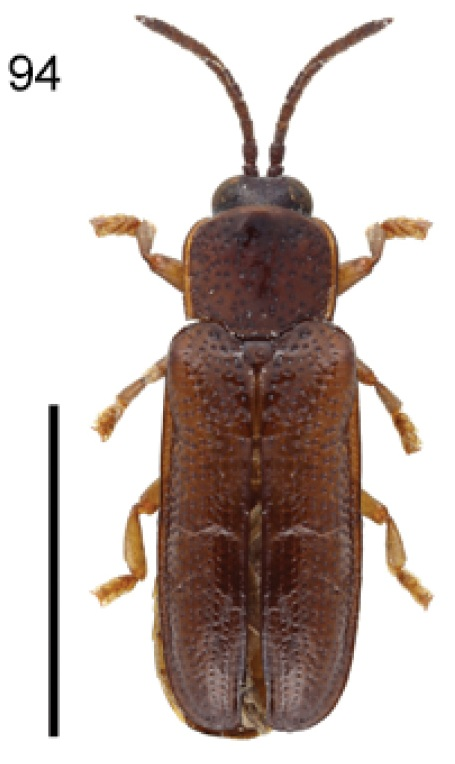

Scientific classification
- Kingdom: Animalia
- Phylum: Arthropoda
- Class: Insecta
- Order: Coleoptera
- Suborder: Polyphaga
- Infraorder: Cucujiformia
- Family: Chrysomelidae
- Genus: Cephaloleia
- Species: C. castanea

Binomial name
- Cephaloleia castanea Pic, 1929

= Cephaloleia castanea =

Species of beetle

Cephaloleia castanea is a species of beetle of the family Chrysomelidae. It is found in Brazil (Río de Janeiro).

== Description ==
Adults reach a length of about 5 mm. Adults are reddish-yellow with black antennae and yellowish legs.
