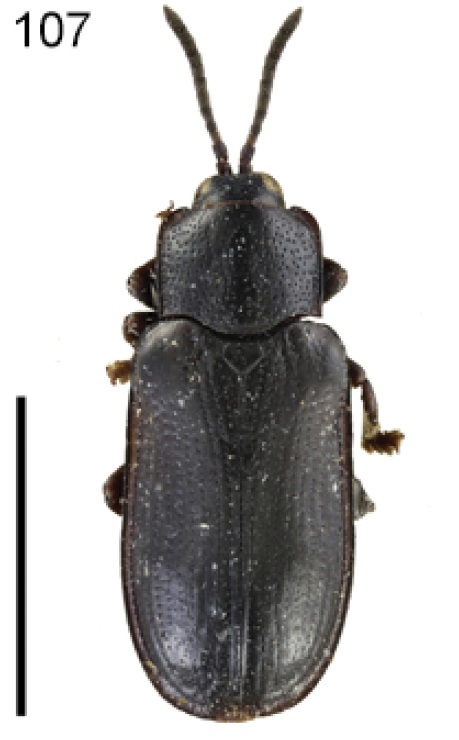

Scientific classification
- Kingdom: Animalia
- Phylum: Arthropoda
- Class: Insecta
- Order: Coleoptera
- Suborder: Polyphaga
- Infraorder: Cucujiformia
- Family: Chrysomelidae
- Genus: Cephaloleia
- Species: C. coroicoana

Binomial name
- Cephaloleia coroicoana Uhmann, 1930

= Cephaloleia coroicoana =

Species of beetle

Cephaloleia coroicoana is a species of beetle of the family Chrysomelidae. It is found in Bolivia and Brazil (Bahia). Records from Venezuela are based on misidentifications.

== Description ==
Adults reach a length of about 4.9–5 mm. Adults are black. The pronotum and elytron have dull black lateral margins and the legs and epipleuron are dark pitchy-black.
