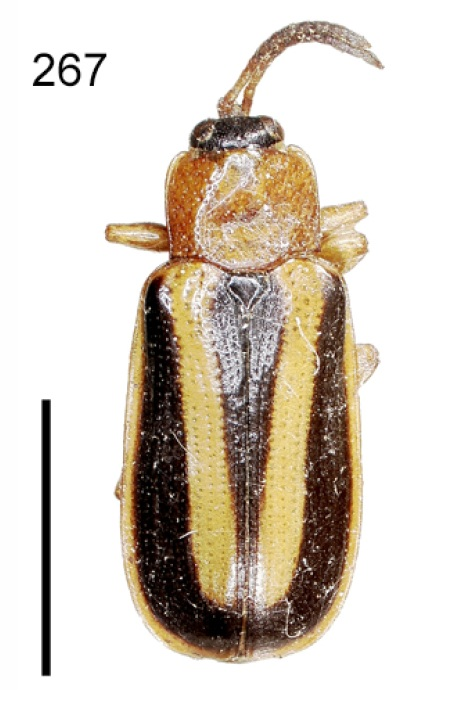

Scientific classification
- Kingdom: Animalia
- Phylum: Arthropoda
- Class: Insecta
- Order: Coleoptera
- Suborder: Polyphaga
- Infraorder: Cucujiformia
- Family: Chrysomelidae
- Genus: Cephaloleia
- Species: C. vittipennis

Binomial name
- Cephaloleia vittipennis Weise, 1910

= Cephaloleia vittipennis =

Species of beetle

Cephaloleia vittipennis is a species of beetle of the family Chrysomelidae. It is found in Argentina, Brazil (Santa Catharina, São Paulo), Peru and Venezuela.

== Description ==
Adults reach a length of about 5.5–6.5 mm. Adults are reddish-yellow, with antennomere 1 yellowish, 2–3 reddish-brown and 4–11 darker. The head and scutellum are black and the elytron is reddish-yellow with a dark sutural vitta on the basal half and a wide black vitta from the humerus curving to the suture near the apex. The lateral and apical margins are reddish-yellow, as are the legs.
