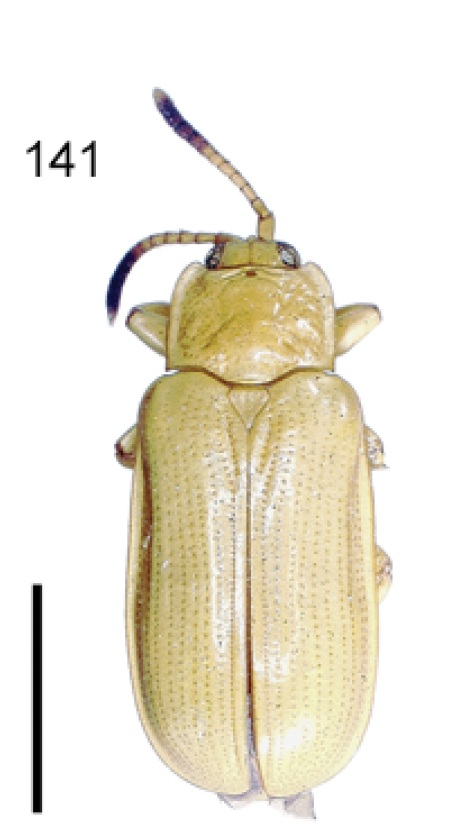

Scientific classification
- Kingdom: Animalia
- Phylum: Arthropoda
- Class: Insecta
- Order: Coleoptera
- Suborder: Polyphaga
- Infraorder: Cucujiformia
- Family: Chrysomelidae
- Genus: Cephaloleia
- Species: C. flava

Binomial name
- Cephaloleia flava Uhmann, 1930

= Cephaloleia flava =

Species of beetle

Cephaloleia flava is a species of beetle of the family Chrysomelidae. It is found in Costa Rica and Panama.

== Description ==
Adults reach a length of about 7.2 mm. Adults are reddish brown with the eyes and antennomeres 6–11 black.
