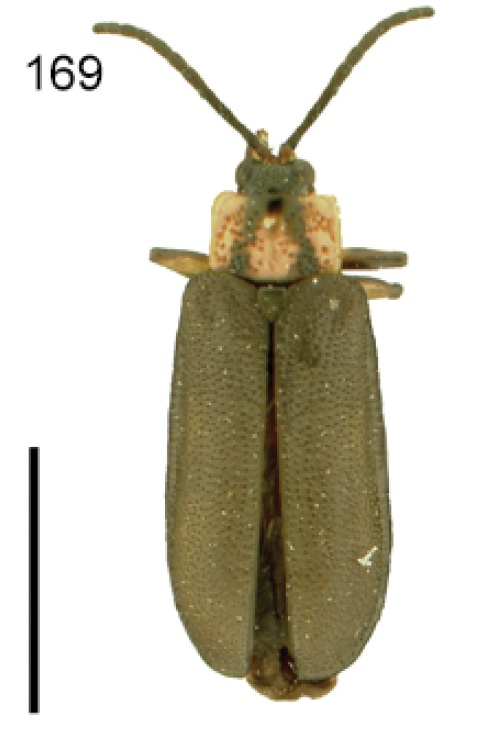

Scientific classification
- Kingdom: Animalia
- Phylum: Arthropoda
- Class: Insecta
- Order: Coleoptera
- Suborder: Polyphaga
- Infraorder: Cucujiformia
- Family: Chrysomelidae
- Genus: Cephaloleia
- Species: C. irregularis

Binomial name
- Cephaloleia irregularis Uhmann, 1930

= Cephaloleia irregularis =

Species of beetle

Cephaloleia irregularis is a species of beetle in the family Chrysomelidae. It is found in Costa Rica.

== Description ==
Adults reach a length of about 6 mm. The head (except at the antennal insertions which are brown), antennae (except for the basal antennomere) and elytron are black, while the pronotum is red with an inverted black V-shaped vitta.
