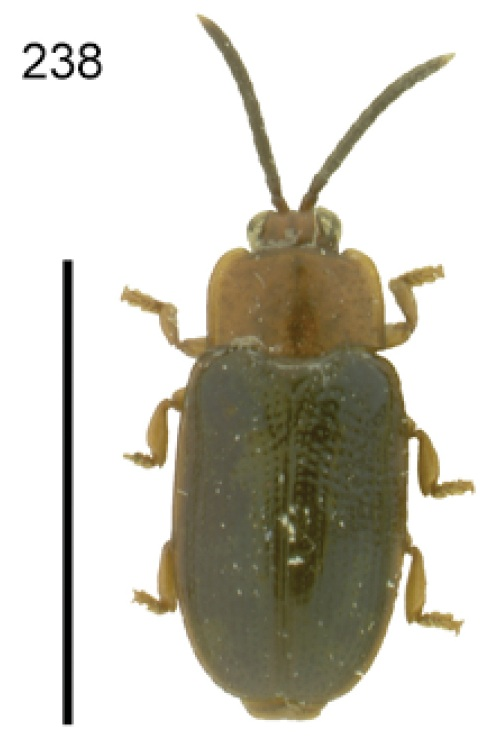

Scientific classification
- Kingdom: Animalia
- Phylum: Arthropoda
- Class: Insecta
- Order: Coleoptera
- Suborder: Polyphaga
- Infraorder: Cucujiformia
- Family: Chrysomelidae
- Genus: Cephaloleia
- Species: C. steinhauseni

Binomial name
- Cephaloleia steinhauseni Uhmann, 1961

Synonyms
- Cephaloleia steinhauseni musae Uhmann, 1961

= Cephaloleia steinhauseni =

Species of beetle

Cephaloleia steinhauseni is a species of beetle of the family Chrysomelidae. It is found in Brazil (Rondonia) and Colombia.

== Description ==
Adults reach a length of about 3–3.5 mm. Adults are reddish-yellow, with the antennae (except for the basal antennomere) black. The elytron is bluish except for the reddish-yellow lateral margin.
