= Cephaloleia jataiensis =

Scientific classification
- Kingdom: Animalia
- Phylum: Arthropoda
- Class: Insecta
- Order: Coleoptera
- Suborder: Polyphaga
- Infraorder: Cucujiformia
- Family: Chrysomelidae
- Genus: Cephaloleia
- Species: C. jataiensis

Binomial name
- Cephaloleia jataiensis (Pic, 1923)

Synonyms
- Demothispa jataiensis Pic, 1923; Parimatidium jataiensis; Xenispa jataiensis

Species of beetle

Cephaloleia jataiensis is a species of beetle of the family Chrysomelidae. It is found in Brazil (Goiás).
