= Cephaloleia vittata =

Scientific classification
- Kingdom: Animalia
- Phylum: Arthropoda
- Class: Insecta
- Order: Coleoptera
- Suborder: Polyphaga
- Infraorder: Cucujiformia
- Family: Chrysomelidae
- Genus: Cephaloleia
- Species: C. vittata

Binomial name
- Cephaloleia vittata Staines, 1996

Species of beetle

Cephaloleia vittata is a species of beetle of the family Chrysomelidae. It is found in Costa Rica.

== Description ==
Adults reach a length of about 4.3 mm. The head, antennae, pronotum and elytron are whitish-yellow with a black sutural vitta at the base which reaches puncture row 2 then narrows gradually posteriorly until only the suture is darkened at the apex.
