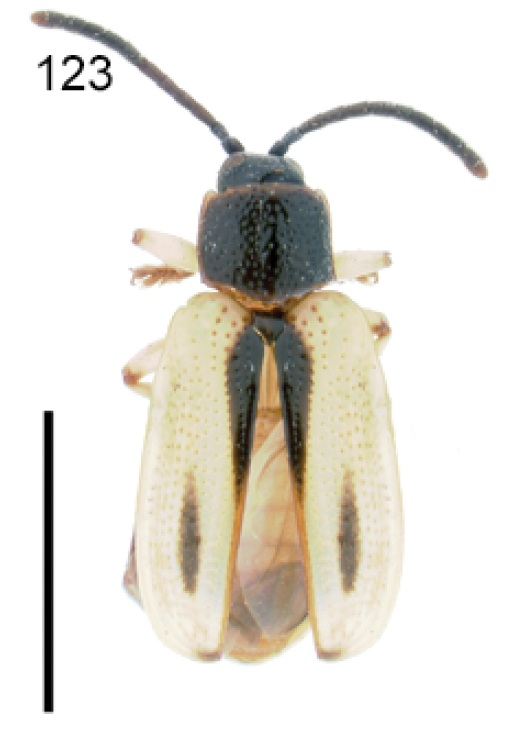

Scientific classification
- Kingdom: Animalia
- Phylum: Arthropoda
- Class: Insecta
- Order: Coleoptera
- Suborder: Polyphaga
- Infraorder: Cucujiformia
- Family: Chrysomelidae
- Genus: Cephaloleia
- Species: C. discoidalis

Binomial name
- Cephaloleia discoidalis Baly, 1885

= Cephaloleia discoidalis =

Species of beetle

Cephaloleia discoidalis is a species of beetle of the family Chrysomelidae. It is found in Guatemala, Mexico, Honduras and Panama.

== Description ==
Adults reach a length of about 5.1–5.4 mm. The head, antennae, pronotum and scutellum are dark brown, while the elytron is yellowish with a dark brown sutural vitta and a brown pointed, ovoid, elongate macula on the apical one-third.
