= Cephaloleia nigronotata =

Scientific classification
- Kingdom: Animalia
- Phylum: Arthropoda
- Class: Insecta
- Order: Coleoptera
- Suborder: Polyphaga
- Infraorder: Cucujiformia
- Family: Chrysomelidae
- Genus: Cephaloleia
- Species: C. nigronotata

Binomial name
- Cephaloleia nigronotata (Pic, 1936)

Synonyms
- Demotispa nigronotata Pic, 1936

Species of beetle

Cephaloleia nigronotata is a species of beetle of the family Chrysomelidae. It is found in Brazil.
