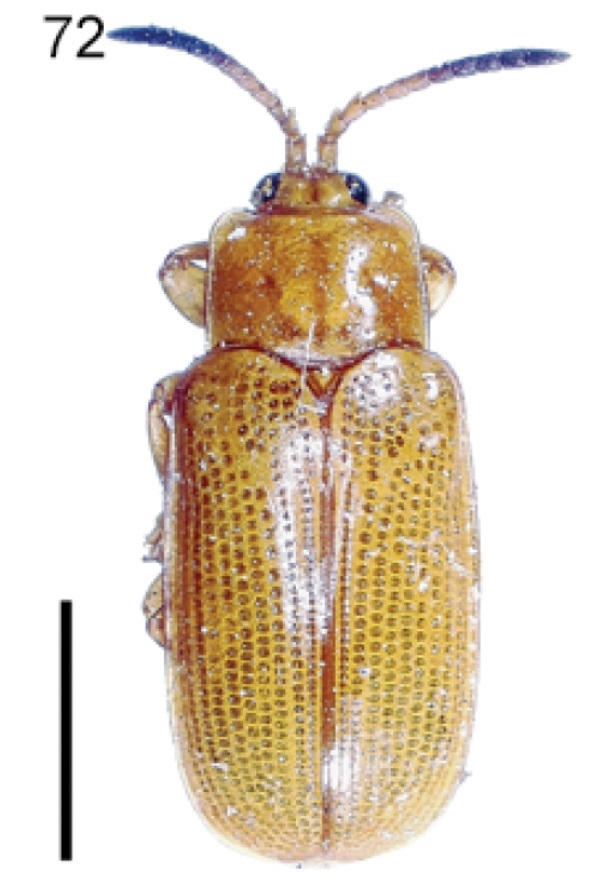

Scientific classification
- Kingdom: Animalia
- Phylum: Arthropoda
- Class: Insecta
- Order: Coleoptera
- Suborder: Polyphaga
- Infraorder: Cucujiformia
- Family: Chrysomelidae
- Genus: Cephaloleia
- Species: C. antennalis

Binomial name
- Cephaloleia antennalis Donckier, 1899

Synonyms
- Cephaloleia antennata Baly, 1885 (preocc.)

= Cephaloleia antennalis =

Species of beetle

Cephaloleia antennalis is a species of beetle of the family Chrysomelidae. It is found in Costa Rica, Guatemala and Panama.

== Description ==
Adults reach a length of about 6.9–8.4 mm. Adults are reddish-brown, with antennomeres 1–4 yellow and 5–11 darker.
