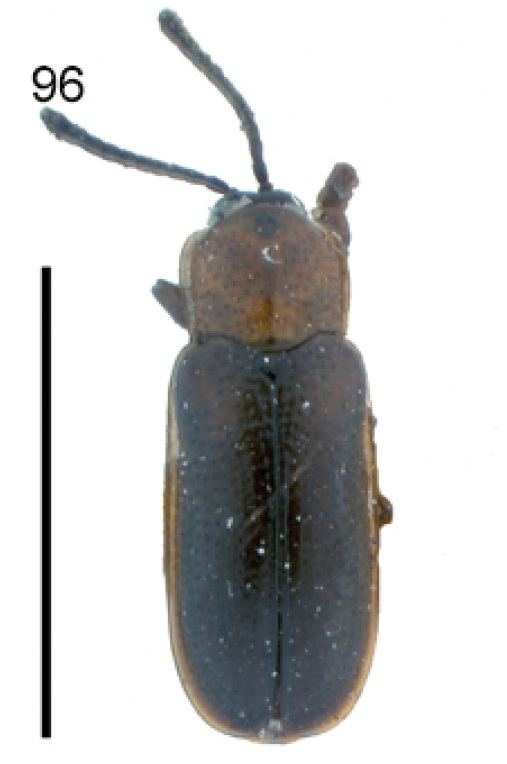

Scientific classification
- Kingdom: Animalia
- Phylum: Arthropoda
- Clade: Pancrustacea
- Class: Insecta
- Order: Coleoptera
- Suborder: Polyphaga
- Infraorder: Cucujiformia
- Family: Chrysomelidae
- Genus: Cephaloleia
- Species: C. chevrolatii

Binomial name
- Cephaloleia chevrolatii Baly, 1858

= Cephaloleia chevrolatii =

Species of beetle

Cephaloleia chevrolatii is a species of beetle of the family Chrysomelidae. It is found in Mexico.

== Description ==
Adults reach a length of about 3.4–3.5 mm. The head, antennae and scutellum are black, while the pronotum is red with the anterior margin black. The elytron is dark with pale margins and an indistinct reddish macula at the humerus.
