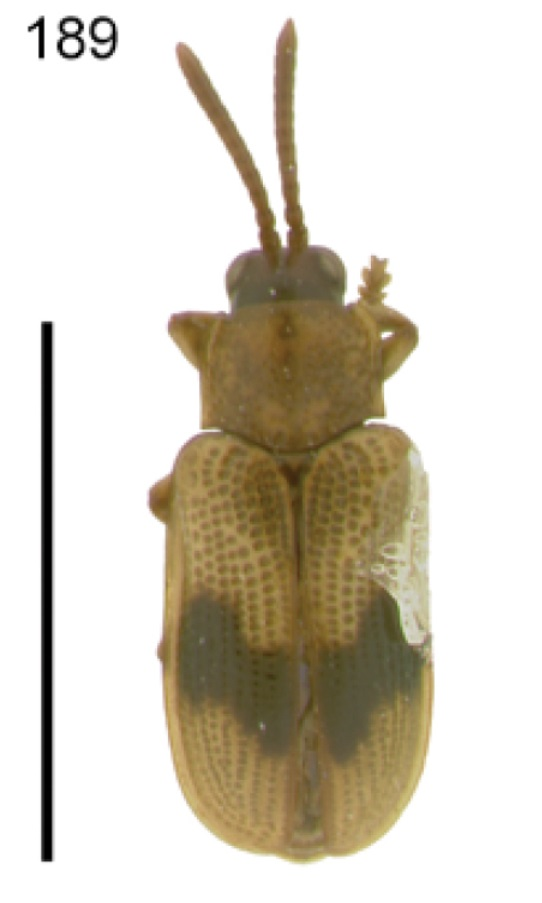

Scientific classification
- Kingdom: Animalia
- Phylum: Arthropoda
- Clade: Pancrustacea
- Class: Insecta
- Order: Coleoptera
- Suborder: Polyphaga
- Infraorder: Cucujiformia
- Family: Chrysomelidae
- Genus: Cephaloleia
- Species: C. nana

Binomial name
- Cephaloleia nana Staines, 2014

= Cephaloleia nana =

Species of beetle

Cephaloleia nana is a species of beetle of the family Chrysomelidae. It is found in Ecuador.

== Description ==
Adults reach a length of about 3.4 mm. The head is brownish-black, while the antennae, pronotum and scutellum are brown. The elytron is yellowish-brown with an irregular black diagonal band ad the legs are yellowish-brown.

== Etymology ==
The species name is derived from Greek and Latin nana (meaning little) and refers to the small size of this species.
