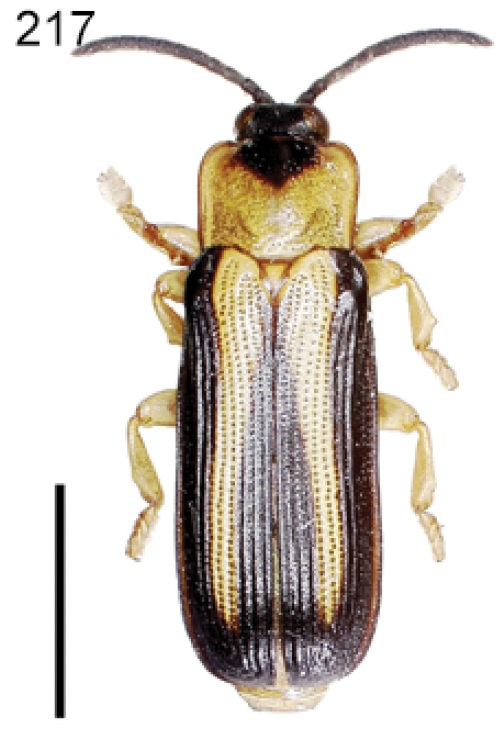

Scientific classification
- Kingdom: Animalia
- Phylum: Arthropoda
- Class: Insecta
- Order: Coleoptera
- Suborder: Polyphaga
- Infraorder: Cucujiformia
- Family: Chrysomelidae
- Genus: Cephaloleia
- Species: C. pulchella

Binomial name
- Cephaloleia pulchella Baly, 1858

= Cephaloleia pulchella =

Species of beetle

Cephaloleia pulchella is a species of beetle of the family Chrysomelidae. It is found in Peru.

== Description ==
Adults reach a length of about 7.7–8.1 mm. The head and antennae (except for the brownish basal 2 antennomeres) are black and the pronotum is yellow (except for an indistinct trilobed dark macula on the anterior margin). The elytron is black with a bright yellow longitudinal vitta medially from the base, narrowing behind and abbreviated near the apex.
