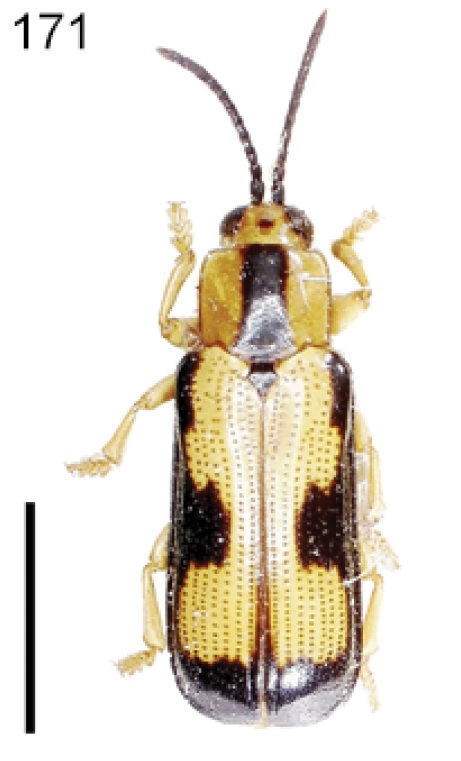

Scientific classification
- Kingdom: Animalia
- Phylum: Arthropoda
- Class: Insecta
- Order: Coleoptera
- Suborder: Polyphaga
- Infraorder: Cucujiformia
- Family: Chrysomelidae
- Genus: Cephaloleia
- Species: C. laeta

Binomial name
- Cephaloleia laeta Waterhouse, 1881

= Cephaloleia laeta =

Species of beetle

Cephaloleia laeta is a species of beetle of the family Chrysomelidae. It is found in Bolivia, Ecuador, Peru and possibly Panama.

== Description ==
Adults reach a length of about 7–7.6 mm. Adults are yellow, while the eyes, antennae and scutellum are black. The pronotum has a black medial vitta and the elytron has black lateral and apical maculae.
