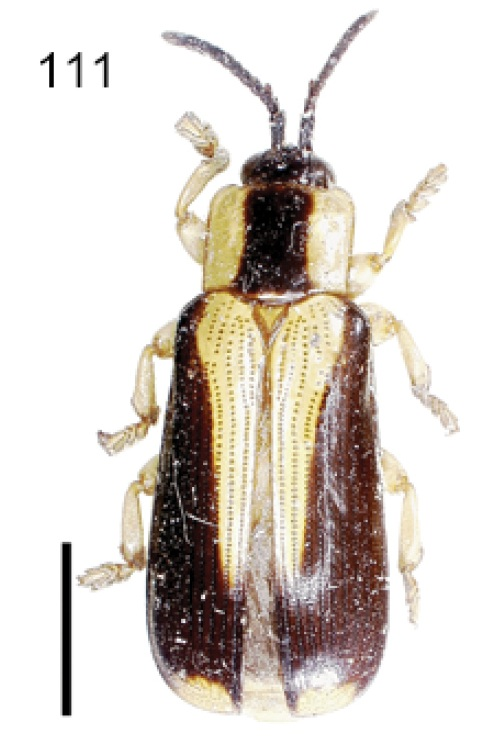

Scientific classification
- Kingdom: Animalia
- Phylum: Arthropoda
- Class: Insecta
- Order: Coleoptera
- Suborder: Polyphaga
- Infraorder: Cucujiformia
- Family: Chrysomelidae
- Genus: Cephaloleia
- Species: C. daguana

Binomial name
- Cephaloleia daguana Uhmann, 1930

Synonyms
- Cephalolia palmarum Pic, 1923

= Cephaloleia daguana =

Species of beetle

Cephaloleia daguana is a species of beetle of the family Chrysomelidae. It is found in Colombia and Ecuador.

== Description ==
Adults reach a length of about 3.4–4.1 mm. Adults are yellowish-brown. The head, antennae and a broad medial pronotal vitta are black. The elytron has a black vitta from the base along the suture extending to beyond the middle and a black apical macula.
