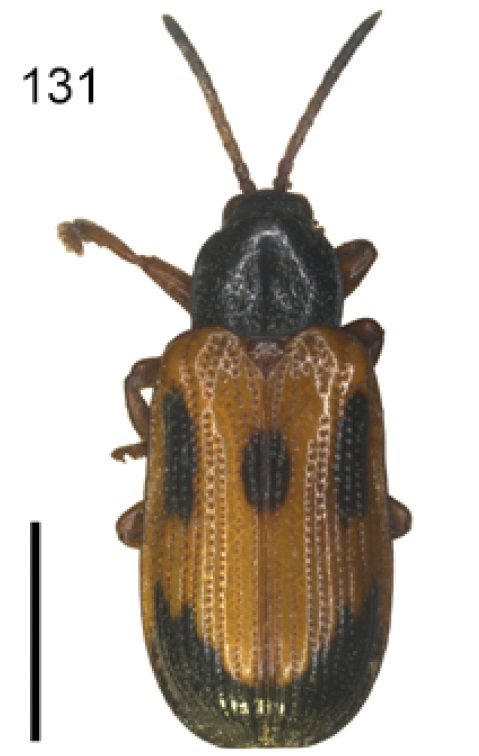

Scientific classification
- Kingdom: Animalia
- Phylum: Arthropoda
- Clade: Pancrustacea
- Class: Insecta
- Order: Coleoptera
- Suborder: Polyphaga
- Infraorder: Cucujiformia
- Family: Chrysomelidae
- Genus: Cephaloleia
- Species: C. emdeni

Binomial name
- Cephaloleia emdeni Uhmann, 1930

= Cephaloleia emdeni =

Species of beetle

Cephaloleia emdeni is a species of beetle of the family Chrysomelidae. It is found in the Rio de Janeiro state of Brazil, with the type locality being Petrópolis.

== Description ==
Adults reach a length of about 7.5 mm. The head, pronotum and antennomeres 7–11 are black, while antennomeres 1–6, the legs and abdomen are reddish-yellow. The elytron is yellowish-brown with an elongate black macula just below the humerus, a black macula on the suture on the apical one-fourth and black apices.
