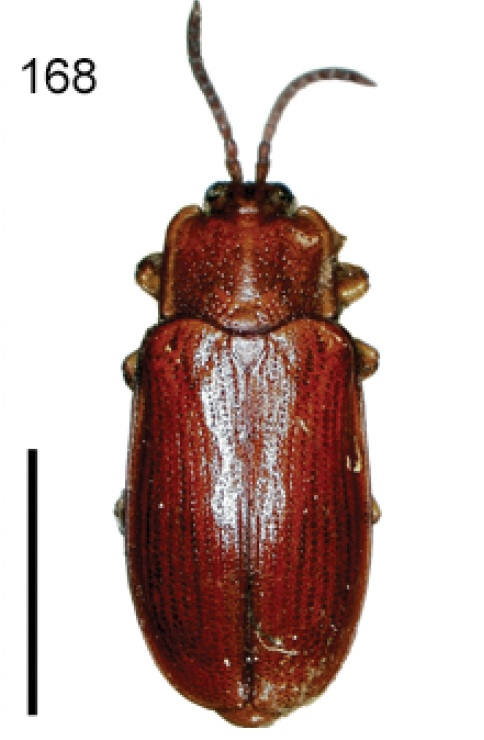

Scientific classification
- Kingdom: Animalia
- Phylum: Arthropoda
- Class: Insecta
- Order: Coleoptera
- Suborder: Polyphaga
- Infraorder: Cucujiformia
- Family: Chrysomelidae
- Genus: Cephaloleia
- Species: C. interstilialis

Binomial name
- Cephaloleia interstilialis Weise, 1904

= Cephaloleia interstitialis =

Species of beetle

Cephaloleia interstilialis is a species of beetle in the family Chrysomelidae. It is found in Brazil (Amazonas, Pará, Rondonia) and Peru.

== Description ==
Adults reach a length of about 5–6 mm. Adults are reddish-yellow, with the apical three antennomeres and eyes darkened.
