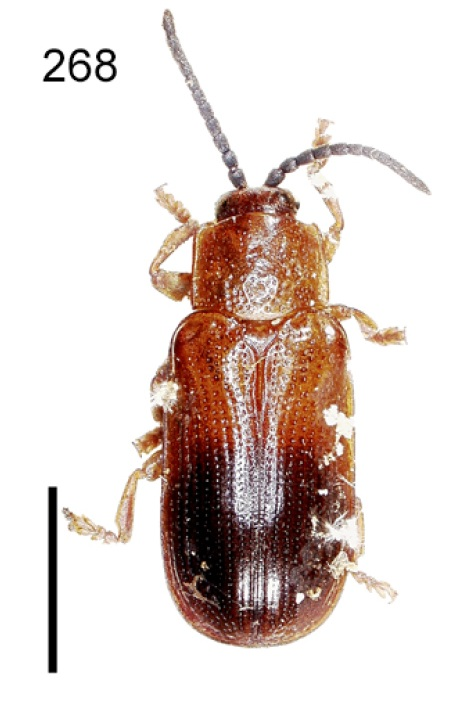

Scientific classification
- Kingdom: Animalia
- Phylum: Arthropoda
- Class: Insecta
- Order: Coleoptera
- Suborder: Polyphaga
- Infraorder: Cucujiformia
- Family: Chrysomelidae
- Genus: Cephaloleia
- Species: C. waterhousei

Binomial name
- Cephaloleia waterhousei Baly, 1858

= Cephaloleia waterhousei =

Species of beetle

Cephaloleia waterhousei is a species of beetle of the family Chrysomelidae. It is found in Brazil (District Federal, Río de Janeiro, Rondonia, Santa Catharina) and Ecuador.

== Description ==
Adults reach a length of about 7–7.9 mm. Adults are dark yellowish, with the antennae (except for the apex of antennomere 11, which is yellowish) and apical two-thirds of the elytron black.
