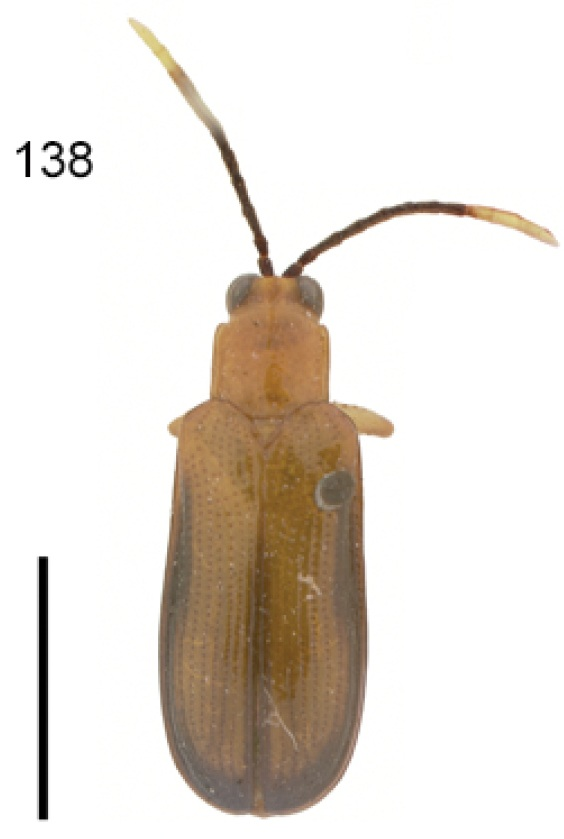

Scientific classification
- Kingdom: Animalia
- Phylum: Arthropoda
- Class: Insecta
- Order: Coleoptera
- Suborder: Polyphaga
- Infraorder: Cucujiformia
- Family: Chrysomelidae
- Genus: Cephaloleia
- Species: C. felix

Binomial name
- Cephaloleia felix Waterhouse, 1881

= Cephaloleia felix =

Species of beetle

Cephaloleia felix is a species of beetle in the family Chrysomelidae. It is found in Ecuador and Peru.

== Description ==
Adults reach a length of about 6–6.4 mm. Adults are yellowish-red, while the antennae are black with antennomeres 9–11 yellow. The elytron has the suture, lateral margin and apical margin black.
