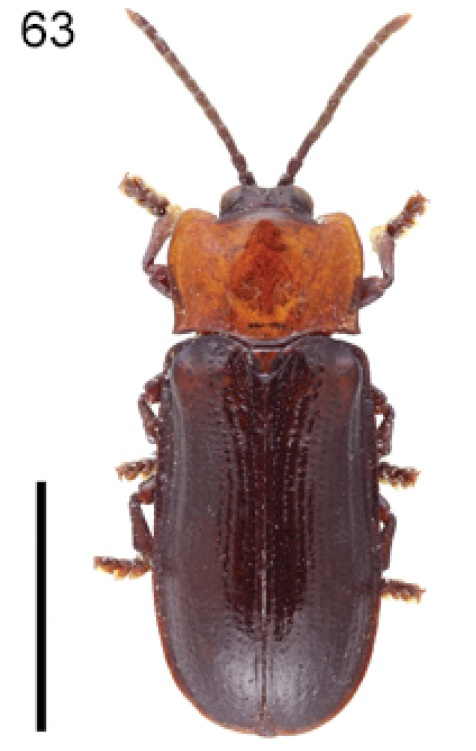

Scientific classification
- Kingdom: Animalia
- Phylum: Arthropoda
- Class: Insecta
- Order: Coleoptera
- Suborder: Polyphaga
- Infraorder: Cucujiformia
- Family: Chrysomelidae
- Genus: Cephaloleia
- Species: C. abdominalis

Binomial name
- Cephaloleia abdominalis Pic, 1926

= Cephaloleia abdominalis =

Species of beetle

Cephaloleia abdominalis is a species of beetle of the family Chrysomelidae. It is found in Peru.

== Description ==
Adults reach a length of about 7 mm. Adults are shining black, while the pronotum, scutellum and abdomen are testaceous. The elytra have a reddish tinge at the humeri.
