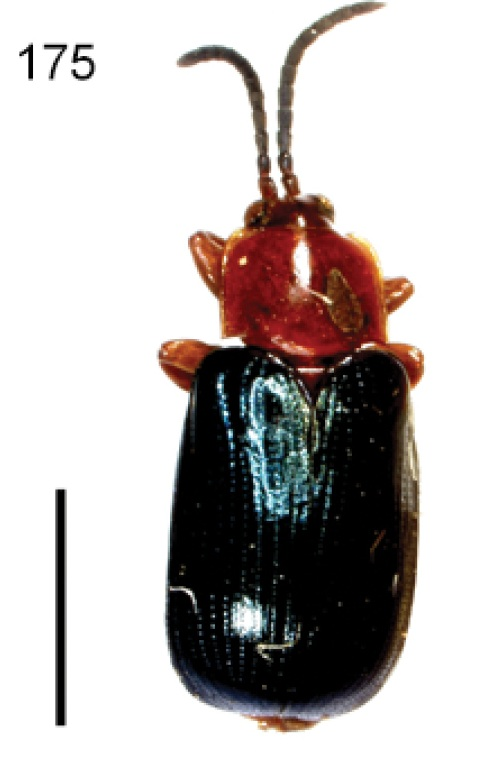

Scientific classification
- Kingdom: Animalia
- Phylum: Arthropoda
- Class: Insecta
- Order: Coleoptera
- Suborder: Polyphaga
- Infraorder: Cucujiformia
- Family: Chrysomelidae
- Genus: Cephaloleia
- Species: C. lepida

Binomial name
- Cephaloleia lepida Staines, 1996

= Cephaloleia lepida =

Species of beetle

Cephaloleia lepida is a species of rolled-leaf beetle in the family Chrysomelidae. It is found in Panama.

== Description ==
Adults reach a length of about 5.7–6.9 mm. The head, antennae, pronotum, scutellum and venter are reddish-brown, while the elytron is metallic blue.

== Biology ==
Adults have been collected in rolled leaves of Zingiberaceae species.
