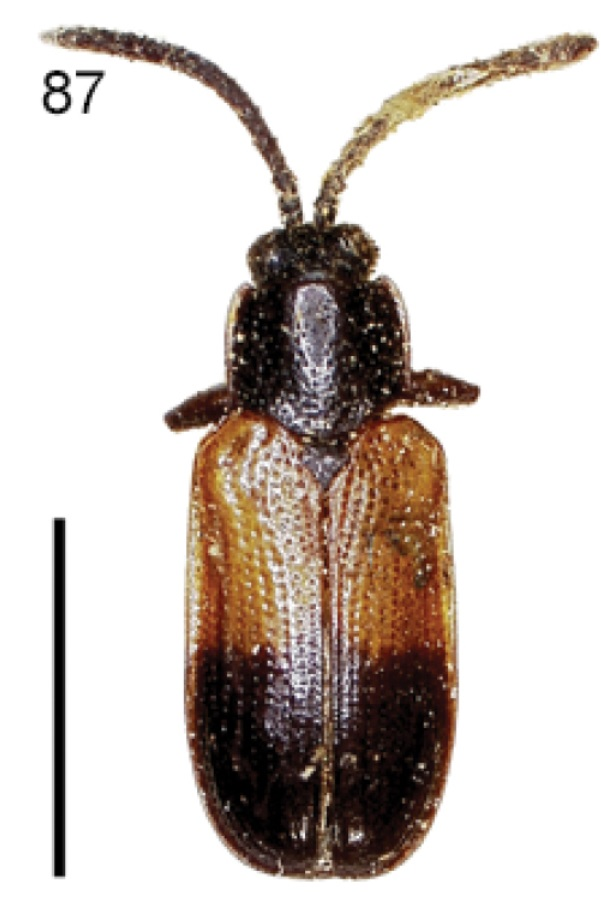

Scientific classification
- Kingdom: Animalia
- Phylum: Arthropoda
- Class: Insecta
- Order: Coleoptera
- Suborder: Polyphaga
- Infraorder: Cucujiformia
- Family: Chrysomelidae
- Genus: Cephaloleia
- Species: C. bicoloriceps

Binomial name
- Cephaloleia bicoloriceps Pic, 1926

= Cephaloleia bicoloriceps =

Species of beetle

Cephaloleia bicoloriceps is a species of beetle of the family Chrysomelidae. It is found in Bolivia, Brazil, Colombia and Ecuador.

== Description ==
Adults reach a length of about 5.4–5.7 mm. The head, antennae, pronotum (except the lateral margins), scutellum and apical half of the elytron are black, while the basal half of the elytron is yellowish. Some specimens have a black sutural vitta which narrows apically to the darker apical half.
