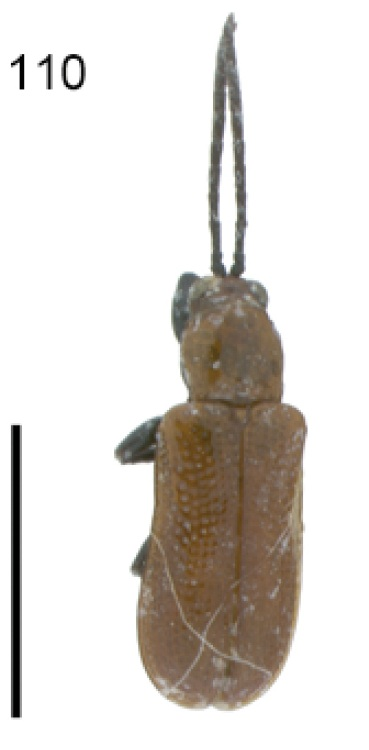

Scientific classification
- Kingdom: Animalia
- Phylum: Arthropoda
- Class: Insecta
- Order: Coleoptera
- Suborder: Polyphaga
- Infraorder: Cucujiformia
- Family: Chrysomelidae
- Genus: Cephaloleia
- Species: C. cylindrica

Binomial name
- Cephaloleia cylindrica Staines, 1996

= Cephaloleia cylindrica =

Species of beetle

Cephaloleia cylindrica is a species of rolled-leaf beetle in the family Chrysomelidae. It is found in Panama and Costa Rica.

== Description ==
Adults reach a length of about 4.7–5.3 mm. Adults are reddish-brown, with the antennae, eyes and legs black.
