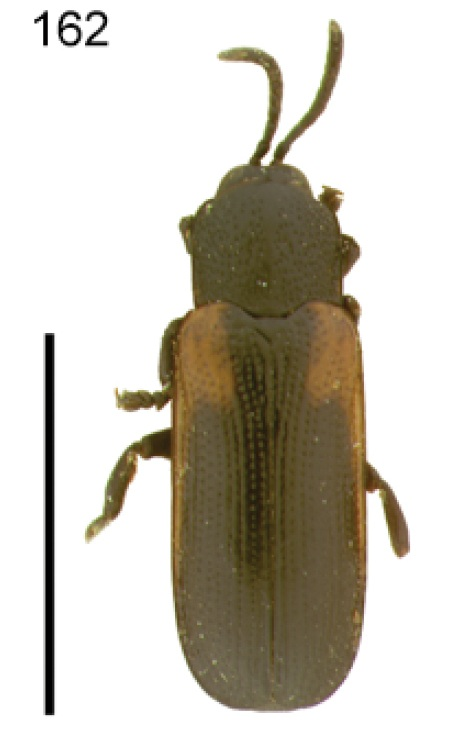

Scientific classification
- Kingdom: Animalia
- Phylum: Arthropoda
- Clade: Pancrustacea
- Class: Insecta
- Order: Coleoptera
- Suborder: Polyphaga
- Infraorder: Cucujiformia
- Family: Chrysomelidae
- Genus: Cephaloleia
- Species: C. humeralis

Binomial name
- Cephaloleia humeralis Weise, 1910

= Cephaloleia humeralis =

Species of beetle

Cephaloleia humeralis is a species of beetle in the family Chrysomelidae. It is found in Brazil (Matto Grosso, Pará) and Peru.

== Description ==
Adults reach a length of about 4–4.4 mm. Adults are black, the elytron with an elongate reddish humeral macula.
