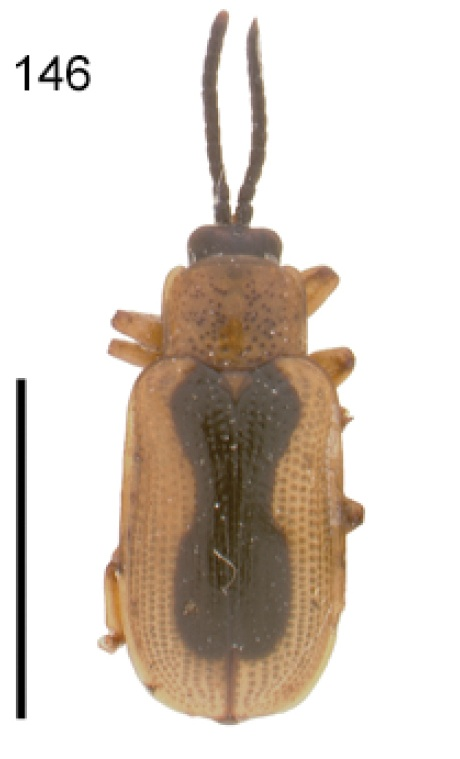

Scientific classification
- Kingdom: Animalia
- Phylum: Arthropoda
- Class: Insecta
- Order: Coleoptera
- Suborder: Polyphaga
- Infraorder: Cucujiformia
- Family: Chrysomelidae
- Genus: Cephaloleia
- Species: C. fryella

Binomial name
- Cephaloleia fryella Baly, 1858

= Cephaloleia fryella =

Species of beetle

Cephaloleia fryella is a species of beetle in the family Chrysomelidae. It is found in Brazil.

== Description ==
Adults reach a length of about 4.5 mm. Adults are dull yellow, with the head, antennae and scutellum black. The elytron is yellowish with a black hourglass-shaped macula along the suture from the base to the apical one-fourth.
