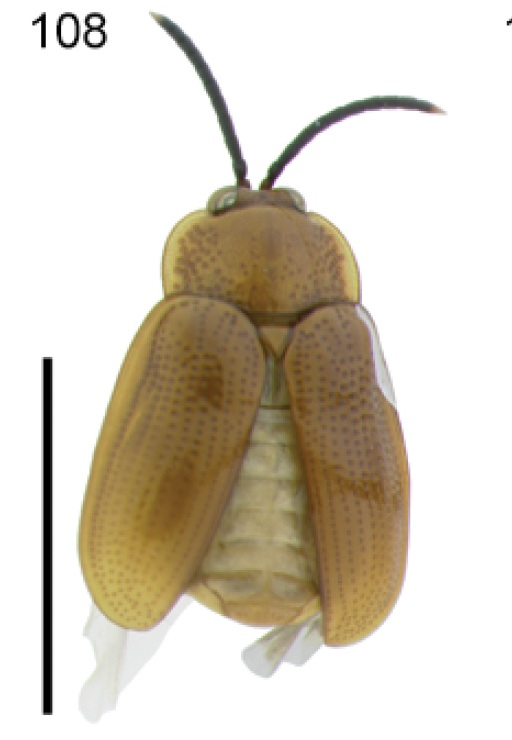

Scientific classification
- Kingdom: Animalia
- Phylum: Arthropoda
- Class: Insecta
- Order: Coleoptera
- Suborder: Polyphaga
- Infraorder: Cucujiformia
- Family: Chrysomelidae
- Genus: Cephaloleia
- Species: C. crenulata

Binomial name
- Cephaloleia crenulata Staines, 2014

= Cephaloleia crenulata =

Species of beetle

Cephaloleia crenulata is a species of beetle of the family Chrysomelidae. It is found in Ecuador.

== Description ==
Adults reach a length of about 3.9 mm. Adults are yellowish-brown, with antennomere 1 yellowish-brown, 2–10 darker and 11 dark basally and paler apically.

== Etymology ==
The species name is derived from Latin crenulatum (meaning minutely emarginate) and refers to the finely emarginate lateral margin of the pronotum.
