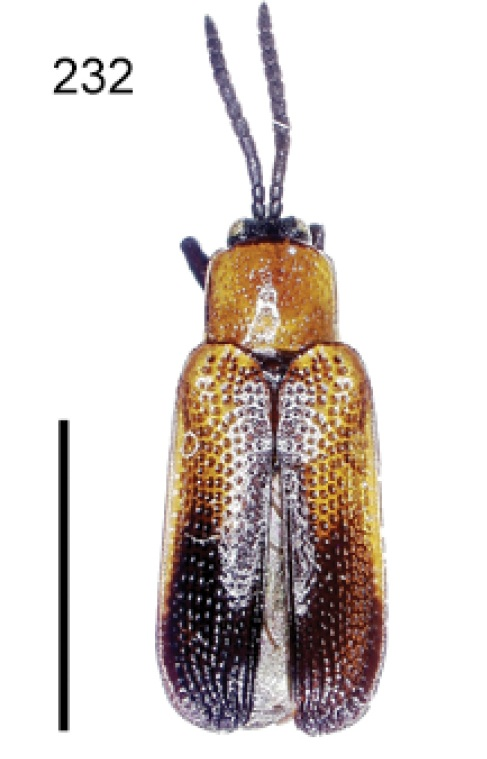

Scientific classification
- Kingdom: Animalia
- Phylum: Arthropoda
- Class: Insecta
- Order: Coleoptera
- Suborder: Polyphaga
- Infraorder: Cucujiformia
- Family: Chrysomelidae
- Genus: Cephaloleia
- Species: C. schmidti

Binomial name
- Cephaloleia schmidti Uhmann, 1933

= Cephaloleia schmidti =

Species of beetle

Cephaloleia schmidti is a species of beetle of the family Chrysomelidae. It is found in Costa Rica and Panama.

== Description ==
Adults reach a length of about 5–5.3 mm. The head, antennae, scutellum, venter and legs are black, while the pronotum is reddish. The basal half of the elytron is reddish-brown with a black sutural vitta and the apical half is black.
