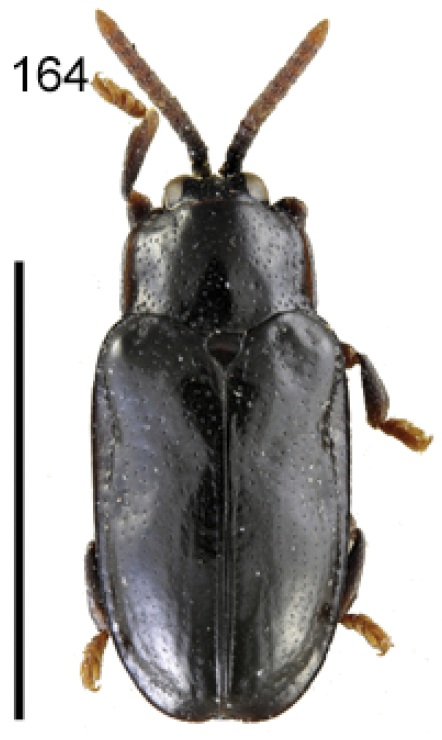

Scientific classification
- Kingdom: Animalia
- Phylum: Arthropoda
- Class: Insecta
- Order: Coleoptera
- Suborder: Polyphaga
- Infraorder: Cucujiformia
- Family: Chrysomelidae
- Genus: Cephaloleia
- Species: C. impressa

Binomial name
- Cephaloleia impressa Uhmann, 1930

Synonyms
- Demothispa clermonti Pic, 1934

= Cephaloleia impressa =

Species of beetle

Cephaloleia impressa is a species of beetle in the family Chrysomelidae. It is found in Brazil (São Paulo, Santa Catarina).

== Description ==
Adults reach a length of about 3.5 mm. Adults are black, with the palps, tarsi and antennae (except for the basal 4 antennomeres) reddish-brown.
