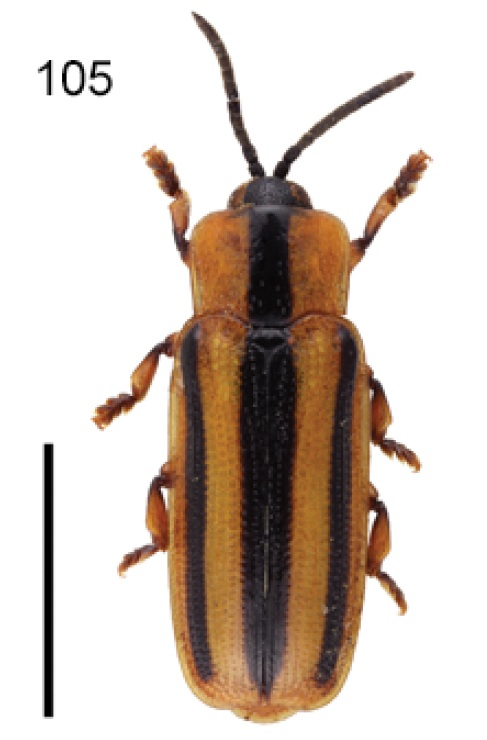

Scientific classification
- Kingdom: Animalia
- Phylum: Arthropoda
- Class: Insecta
- Order: Coleoptera
- Suborder: Polyphaga
- Infraorder: Cucujiformia
- Family: Chrysomelidae
- Genus: Cephaloleia
- Species: C. convexifrons

Binomial name
- Cephaloleia convexifrons Pic, 1923

= Cephaloleia convexifrons =

Species of beetle

Cephaloleia convexifrons is a species of beetle of the family Chrysomelidae. It is found in Bolivia and Peru.

== Description ==
Adults reach a length of about 5.9–6.1 mm. The antennae, head and scutellum are black and the pronotum is yellowish with a broad medial longitudinal vitta from the base to the apex. The elytron is yellowish with a broad black sutural vitta which narrows to the apex and a narrow black vitta from the humerus to near the apex. The legs are yellowish with darker joints and tarsi.
