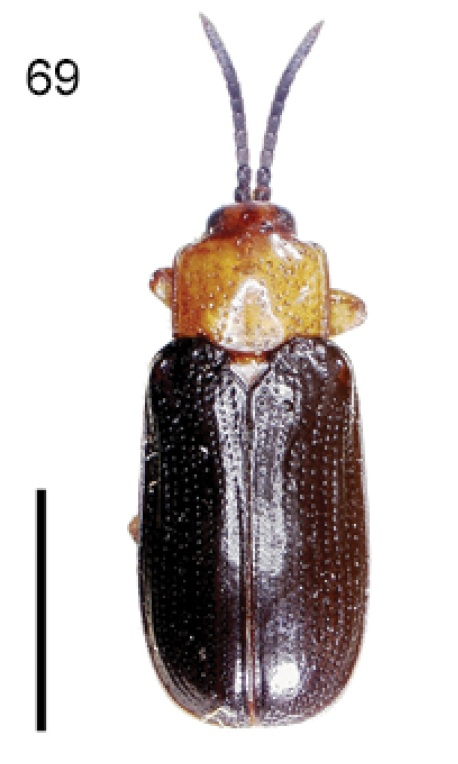

Scientific classification
- Kingdom: Animalia
- Phylum: Arthropoda
- Class: Insecta
- Order: Coleoptera
- Suborder: Polyphaga
- Infraorder: Cucujiformia
- Family: Chrysomelidae
- Genus: Cephaloleia
- Species: C. amazona

Binomial name
- Cephaloleia amazona Baly, 1869

= Cephaloleia amazona =

Species of beetle

Cephaloleia amazona is a species of beetle of the family Chrysomelidae. It is found in Brazil (Minas Gerais, Santa Catharina) and Peru.

== Description ==
Adults reach a length of about 5.6–6.8 mm. They have a black elytron, yellowish abdomen and reddish-yellow head, antennae, pronotum and scutellum.

== Biology ==
The hostplant is unknown, but adults have been collected on Heliconia velutina.
