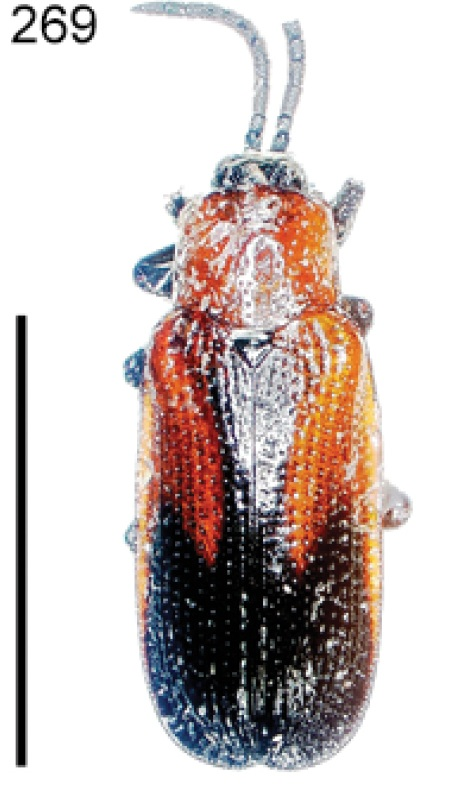

Scientific classification
- Kingdom: Animalia
- Phylum: Arthropoda
- Class: Insecta
- Order: Coleoptera
- Suborder: Polyphaga
- Infraorder: Cucujiformia
- Family: Chrysomelidae
- Genus: Cephaloleia
- Species: C. weisei

Binomial name
- Cephaloleia weisei Staines, 1996

= Cephaloleia weisei =

Species of beetle

Cephaloleia weisei is a species of rolled-leaf beetle in the family Chrysomelidae. It is found in Costa Rica and Panama.

== Description ==
Adults reach a length of about 3.6–4.1 mm. The head, antennomeres 1–2, pronotum and basal half of the elytron are yellowish, while the eyes, antennal antennomeres 3–11 and apical half of the elytron are black. The venter and legs are reddish-yellow.
