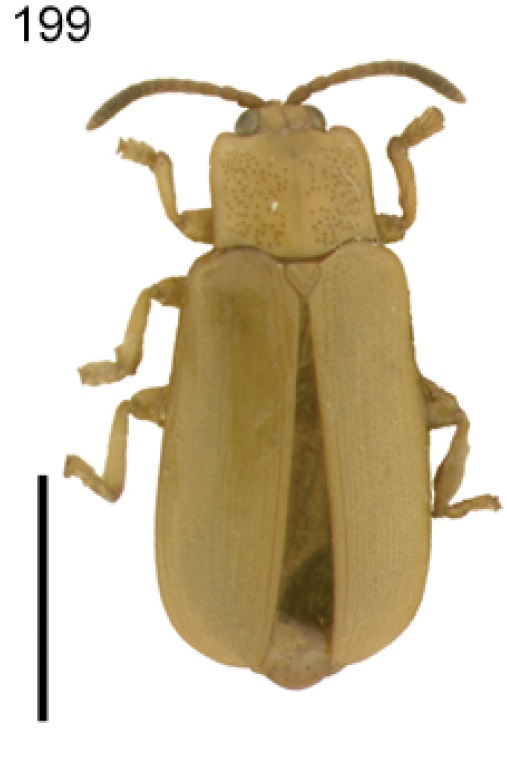

Scientific classification
- Kingdom: Animalia
- Phylum: Arthropoda
- Clade: Pancrustacea
- Class: Insecta
- Order: Coleoptera
- Suborder: Polyphaga
- Infraorder: Cucujiformia
- Family: Chrysomelidae
- Genus: Cephaloleia
- Species: C. ochra

Binomial name
- Cephaloleia ochra Staines, 2014

= Cephaloleia ochra =

Species of beetle

Cephaloleia ochra is a species of beetle of the family Chrysomelidae. It is found in Ecuador.

== Description ==
Adults reach a length of about 7 mm. Adults are ochre-yellow, with the eyes and apical antennomeres darker.

== Etymology ==
The species name is derived from Latin ochrus and refers to the ochre yellow body colour of this species.
