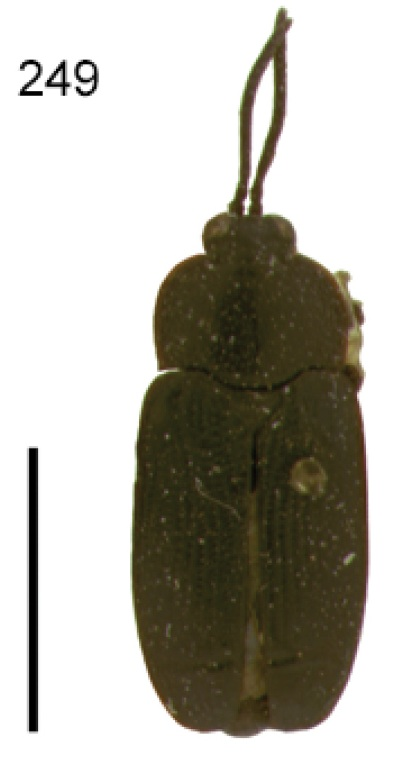

Scientific classification
- Kingdom: Animalia
- Phylum: Arthropoda
- Class: Insecta
- Order: Coleoptera
- Suborder: Polyphaga
- Infraorder: Cucujiformia
- Family: Chrysomelidae
- Genus: Cephaloleia
- Species: C. tarsata

Binomial name
- Cephaloleia tarsata Baly, 1858

= Cephaloleia tarsata =

Species of beetle

Cephaloleia tarsata is a species of beetle of the family Chrysomelidae. It is found in Brazil and Colombia.

== Description ==
Adults reach a length of about 5.5–5.6 mm. Adults are dark metallic blue. The pronotum is paler laterally and the legs are also paler.
