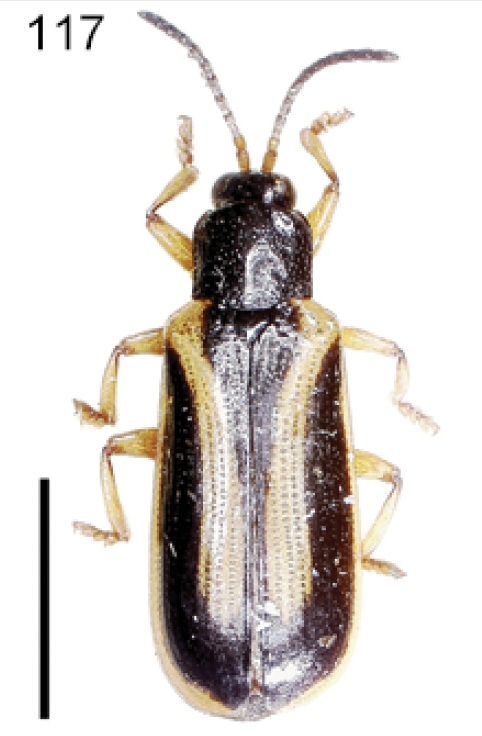

Scientific classification
- Kingdom: Animalia
- Phylum: Arthropoda
- Class: Insecta
- Order: Coleoptera
- Suborder: Polyphaga
- Infraorder: Cucujiformia
- Family: Chrysomelidae
- Genus: Cephaloleia
- Species: C. deyrollei

Binomial name
- Cephaloleia deyrollei Baly, 1858

= Cephaloleia deyrollei =

Species of beetle

Cephaloleia deyrollei is a species of beetle of the family Chrysomelidae. It is found in Bolivia, Brazil (Bahia, Corcovado, Paraná, Río de Janeiro, Santa Catharina, São Paulo), Ecuador and French Guiana.

== Description ==
Adults reach a length of about 5.8–7 mm. Adults are black, while the eyes are dark, and the antennomeres are all black or 1–4 yellowish and 5–11 dark. The elytron has a yellowish vitta and a yellowish lateral margin.

== Biology ==
They have been recorded on Marantha species.
