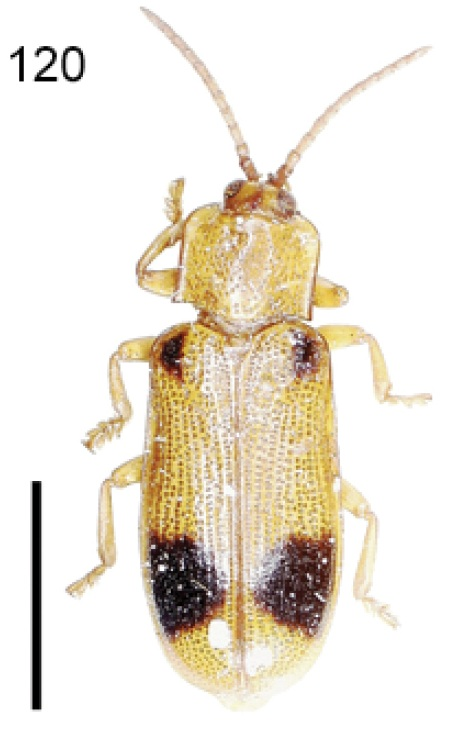

Scientific classification
- Kingdom: Animalia
- Phylum: Arthropoda
- Clade: Pancrustacea
- Class: Insecta
- Order: Coleoptera
- Suborder: Polyphaga
- Infraorder: Cucujiformia
- Family: Chrysomelidae
- Genus: Cephaloleia
- Species: C. dilectans

Binomial name
- Cephaloleia dilectans Pic, 1923

= Cephaloleia dilectans =

Species of beetle

Cephaloleia dilectans is a species of beetle of the family Chrysomelidae. It is found in Ecuador and Peru.

== Description ==
Adults reach a length of about 6.8–7.2 mm. Adults are yellow. The elytron has a black humeral macula and a black transverse band beyond the middle which ends on the apical one-fourth.
