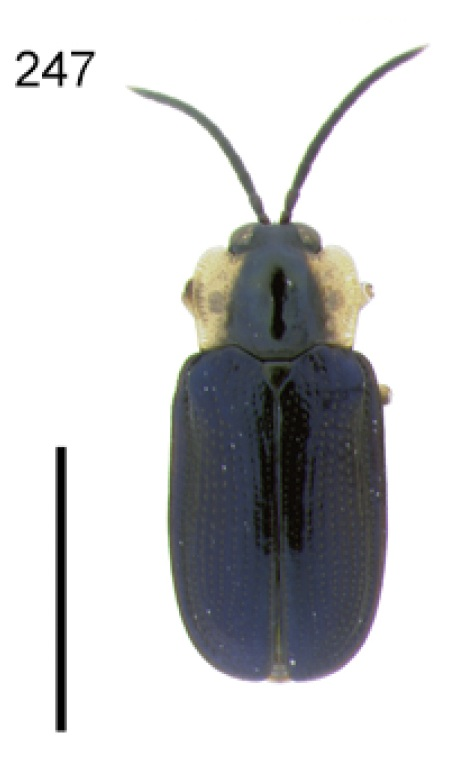

Scientific classification
- Kingdom: Animalia
- Phylum: Arthropoda
- Clade: Pancrustacea
- Class: Insecta
- Order: Coleoptera
- Suborder: Polyphaga
- Infraorder: Cucujiformia
- Family: Chrysomelidae
- Genus: Cephaloleia
- Species: C. susanae

Binomial name
- Cephaloleia susanae Staines, 2014

= Cephaloleia susanae =

Species of beetle

Cephaloleia susanae is a species of beetle of the family Chrysomelidae. It is found in Brazil (Pará) and Ecuador.

== Description ==
Adults reach a length of about 4.9 mm. The antennae, head and elytron are shining bluish-black, while the pronotum is yellowish with a wide medial longitudinal black vitta from the anterior to posterior margins.

== Etymology ==
Named for Susan L. Staines in acknowledgement of her constant, continuing encouragement and help in taxonomic projects.
