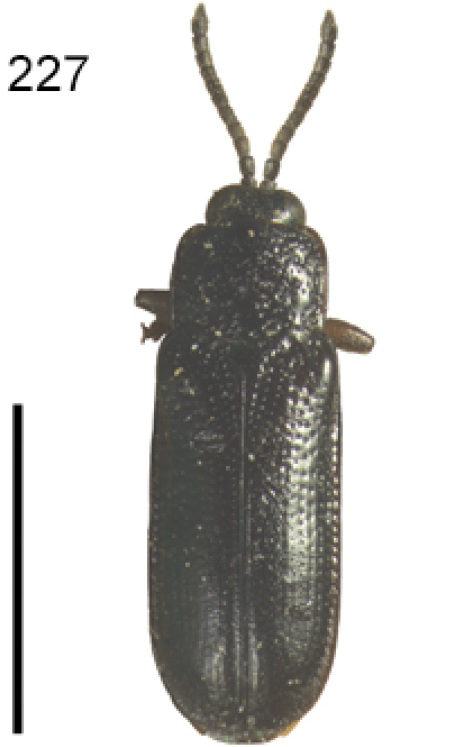

Scientific classification
- Kingdom: Animalia
- Phylum: Arthropoda
- Class: Insecta
- Order: Coleoptera
- Suborder: Polyphaga
- Infraorder: Cucujiformia
- Family: Chrysomelidae
- Genus: Cephaloleia
- Species: C. rufipes

Binomial name
- Cephaloleia rufipes Pic, 1929

= Cephaloleia rufipes =

Species of beetle

Cephaloleia rufipes is a species of beetle of the family Chrysomelidae. It is found in Brazil.

== Description ==
Adults reach a length of about 5 mm. Adults are black with reddish legs. The venter is covered with white pubescence (denser on the abdomen).
