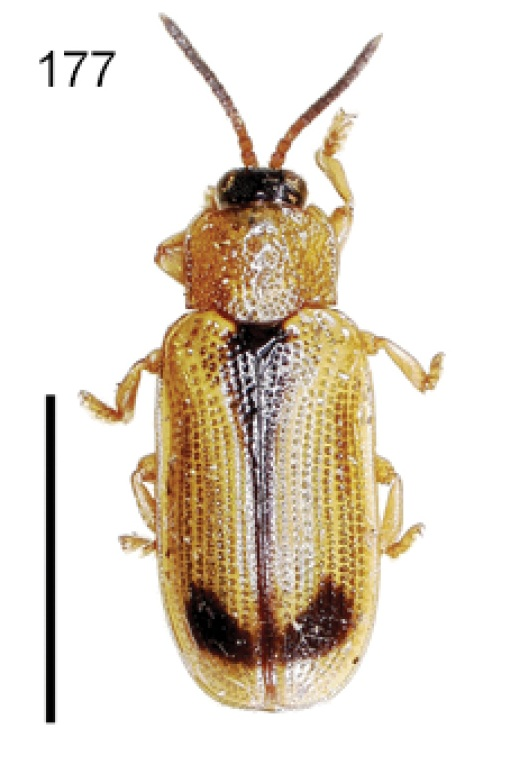

Scientific classification
- Kingdom: Animalia
- Phylum: Arthropoda
- Class: Insecta
- Order: Coleoptera
- Suborder: Polyphaga
- Infraorder: Cucujiformia
- Family: Chrysomelidae
- Genus: Cephaloleia
- Species: C. linkei

Binomial name
- Cephaloleia linkei Uhmann, 1939

= Cephaloleia linkei =

Species of beetle

Cephaloleia linkei is a species of beetle of the family Chrysomelidae. It is found in Argentina and Brazil (Santa Catharina, São Paulo).

== Description ==
Adults reach a length of about 4.9–5.4 mm. Adults are yellowish-brown, with variable black markings on the elytron.
