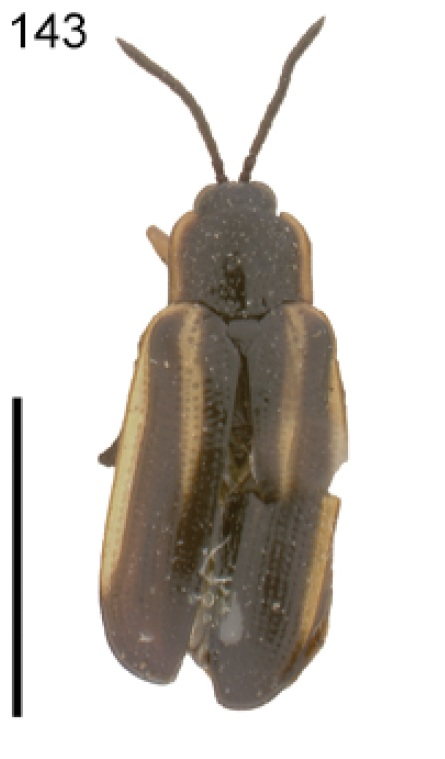

Scientific classification
- Kingdom: Animalia
- Phylum: Arthropoda
- Class: Insecta
- Order: Coleoptera
- Suborder: Polyphaga
- Infraorder: Cucujiformia
- Family: Chrysomelidae
- Genus: Cephaloleia
- Species: C. flavovittata

Binomial name
- Cephaloleia flavovittata Baly, 1858

= Cephaloleia flavovittata =

Species of beetle

Cephaloleia flavovittata is a species of beetle in the family Chrysomelidae. It is found in Brazil.

== Description ==
Adults reach a length of about 5 mm. Adults are black, while the pronotum has a yellow lateral margin and the elytron also has a yellow lateral margin, but also a yellow vitta from the humerus to the middle. The legs are yellow.

== Biology ==
The recorded host plant is Pharus latifolius.
