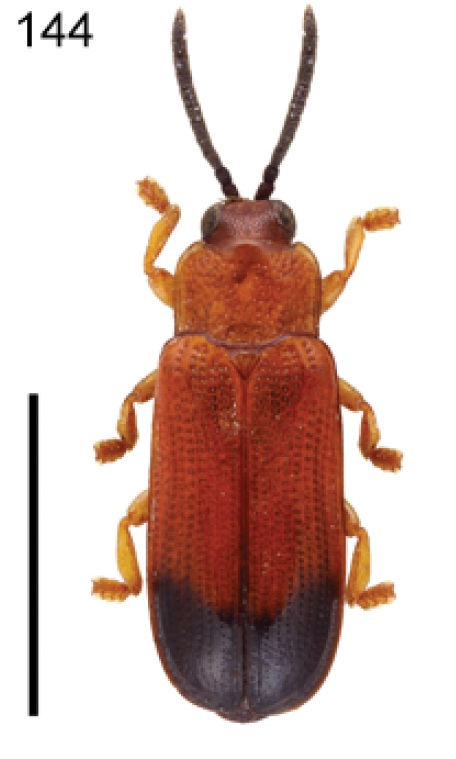

Scientific classification
- Kingdom: Animalia
- Phylum: Arthropoda
- Clade: Pancrustacea
- Class: Insecta
- Order: Coleoptera
- Suborder: Polyphaga
- Infraorder: Cucujiformia
- Family: Chrysomelidae
- Genus: Cephaloleia
- Species: C. forestieri

Binomial name
- Cephaloleia forestieri Pic, 1926

= Cephaloleia forestieri =

Species of beetle

Cephaloleia forestieri is a species of beetle in the family Chrysomelidae. It is found in Colombia and French Guiana.

== Description ==
Adults reach a length of about 4.2–5 mm. Adults are reddish, while the eyes and antennae are black. The elytral apex has a broad, oblique black marking.
