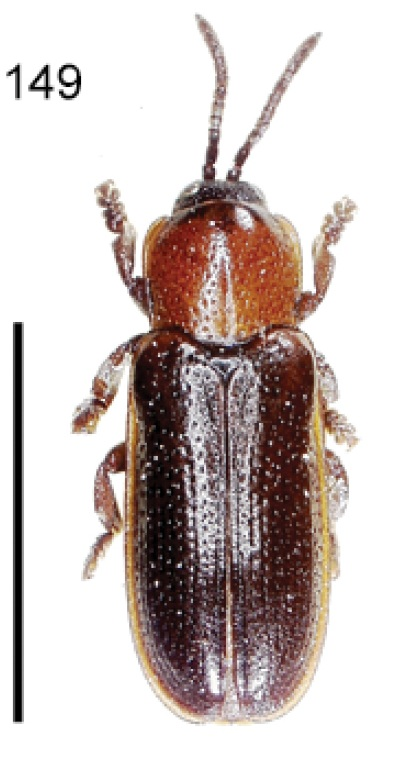

Scientific classification
- Kingdom: Animalia
- Phylum: Arthropoda
- Class: Insecta
- Order: Coleoptera
- Suborder: Polyphaga
- Infraorder: Cucujiformia
- Family: Chrysomelidae
- Genus: Cephaloleia
- Species: C. fulvolimbata

Binomial name
- Cephaloleia fulvolimbata Baly, 1885

= Cephaloleia fulvolimbata =

Species of beetle

Cephaloleia fulvolimbata is a species of beetle in the family Chrysomelidae. It is found in Belize, Guatemala, Honduras and Mexico.

== Description ==
Adults reach a length of about 4 mm. The head, antennae (except antennomere 1 and the apex of 11, which are reddish-black), scutellum and elytron (except for the margins) are dark, while pronotum is reddish with a narrow black vitta laterally. The legs are mostly red.
