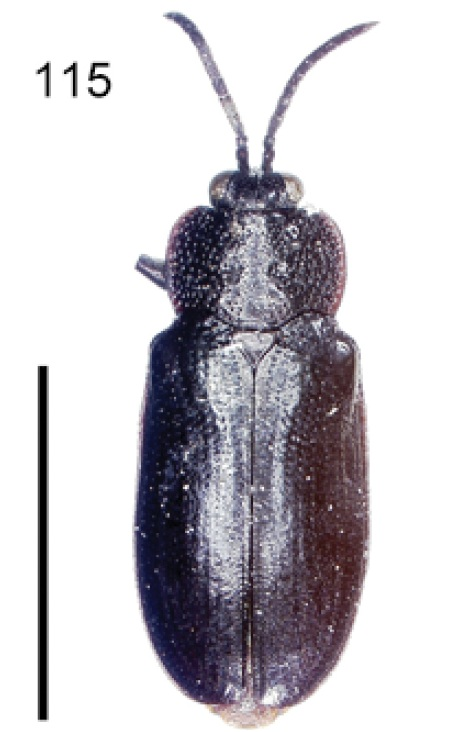
- Cephaloleia deplanata

Scientific classification
- Kingdom: Animalia
- Phylum: Arthropoda
- Clade: Pancrustacea
- Class: Insecta
- Order: Coleoptera
- Suborder: Polyphaga
- Infraorder: Cucujiformia
- Family: Chrysomelidae
- Subfamily: Cassidinae
- Tribe: Imatidiini
- Genus: Cephaloleia; Chevrolat in Dejean, 1836

Species
- See text

Synonyms
- Cephalolia Blanchard, 1845 (Missp.); Uhmannispa Monrós & Viana, 1947

= Cephaloleia =

Genus of beetles

Cephaloleia is a genus of beetle in the subfamily Cassidinae of family Chrysomelidae. It is endemic to the Neotropical realm.

== Species ==
As of 2014, there are 214 species described in the genus, including the following:

- Cephaloleia abdita
- Cephaloleia abdominalis
- Cephaloleia adusta
- Cephaloleia aequilata
- Cephaloleia affinis
- Cephaloleia alternans
- Cephaloleia amazona
- Cephaloleia amba
- Cephaloleia amblys
- Cephaloleia angustacollis
- Cephaloleia antennalis
- Cephaloleia antennata
- Cephaloleia apertura (Staines, 2013)
- Cephaloleia apicalis
- Cephaloleia apicata
- Cephaloleia apicenotata
- Cephaloleia apicicornis
- Cephaloleia applicata
- Cephaloleia approximata
- Cephaloleia atriceps
- Cephaloleia atripes (Pic, 1926)
- Cephaloleia balyi
- Cephaloleia barroi
- Cephaloleia basalis
- Cephaloleia bella
- Cephaloleia belti
- Cephaloleia bicolor
- Cephaloleia bicoloriceps
- Cephaloleia bifasciata
- Cephaloleia bondari
- Cephaloleia brevis
- Cephaloleia brunnea
- Cephaloleia bucki
- Cephaloleia caerulata
- Cephaloleia calathae
- Cephaloleia castanea
- Cephaloleia championi
- Cephaloleia chevrolatii
- Cephaloleia chica
- Cephaloleia chimboana
- Cephaloleia clarkella
- Cephaloleia cognata
- Cephaloleia collaris
- Cephaloleia conforma
- Cephaloleia congener
- Cephaloleia consanguinea
- Cephaloleia convexifrons
- Cephaloleia corallina
- Cephaloleia coroicoana
- Cephaloleia crenulata
- Cephaloleia cylindrica
- Cephaloleia daguana
- Cephaloleia deficiens
- Cephaloleia degandei
- Cephaloleia deplanata
- Cephaloleia depressa
- Cephaloleia deyrollei
- Cephaloleia dilaticollis
- Cephaloleia dilectans
- Cephaloleia dimidiaticornis
- Cephaloleia diplothemium
- Cephaloleia discoidalis
- Cephaloleia disjuncta
- Cephaloleia distincta
- Cephaloleia donckieri
- Cephaloleia dorsalis
- Cephaloleia elaeidis
- Cephaloleia elegantula
- Cephaloleia emarginata
- Cephaloleia emdeni
- Cephaloleia erichsonii
- Cephaloleia erugata
- Cephaloleia eumorpha
- Cephaloleia eximia
- Cephaloleia faceta
- Cephaloleia fasciata
- Cephaloleia felix
- Cephaloleia fenestrata
- Cephaloleia fernandoi
- Cephaloleia fiebrigi
- Cephaloleia flava
- Cephaloleia flavipennis
- Cephaloleia flavovittata
- Cephaloleia forestieri
- Cephaloleia fouquei
- Cephaloleia fryella
- Cephaloleia fulvicollis
- Cephaloleia fulvipes
- Cephaloleia fulvolimbata
- Cephaloleia funesta
- Cephaloleia gemma
- Cephaloleia gratiosa
- Cephaloleia grayei
- Cephaloleia halli
- Cephaloleia heliconiae
- Cephaloleia histrio
- Cephaloleia histrionica
- Cephaloleia h-nigrum
- Cephaloleia horvitzae
- Cephaloleia humeralis
- Cephaloleia immaculata
- Cephaloleia impressa
- Cephaloleia insidiosa
- Cephaloleia instabilis
- Cephaloleia interrupta
- Cephaloleia interstitialis
- Cephaloleia irregularis
- Cephaloleia jataiensis
- Cephaloleia kolbei
- Cephaloleia kressi
- Cephaloleia kuprewiczae
- Cephaloleia laeta
- Cephaloleia lateralis
- Cephaloleia latipennis
- Cephaloleia lenticula
- Cephaloleia lepida
- Cephaloleia leucoxantha
- Cephaloleia linkei
- Cephaloleia lojaensis
- Cephaloleia luctuosa
- Cephaloleia luridipennis
- Cephaloleia lydiae
- Cephaloleia maculipennis
- Cephaloleia marantae
- Cephaloleia marginella
- Cephaloleia marshalli
- Cephaloleia mauliki
- Cephaloleia maxima
- Cephaloleia metallescens
- Cephaloleia nana
- Cephaloleia neglecta
- Cephaloleia nevermanni
- Cephaloleia nigriceps
- Cephaloleia nigricornis
- Cephaloleia nigrithorax
- Cephaloleia nigronotata
- Cephaloleia nigropicta
- Cephaloleia nitida
- Cephaloleia nubila
- Cephaloleia ochra
- Cephaloleia obsoleta
- Cephaloleia opaca
- Cephaloleia orchideivora
- Cephaloleia ornata
- Cephaloleia ornatrix
- Cephaloleia ornatula
- Cephaloleia parenthesis
- Cephaloleia partita
- Cephaloleia parvula
- Cephaloleia perplexa
- Cephaloleia pici
- Cephaloleia picta
- Cephaloleia placida
- Cephaloleia polita
- Cephaloleia postuma
- Cephaloleia presignis
- Cephaloleia pretiosa
- Cephaloleia princeps
- Cephaloleia proxima
- Cephaloleia pulchella
- Cephaloleia punctatissima
- Cephaloleia puncticollis
- Cephaloleia quadrilineata
- Cephaloleia quinquemaculata
- Cephaloleia recondita
- Cephaloleia renei
- Cephaloleia reventazonica
- Cephaloleia rosenbergi
- Cephaloleia rubra
- Cephaloleia ruficollis
- Cephaloleia rufipes
- Cephaloleia sagittifera
- Cephaloleia sallei
- Cephaloleia sandersoni
- Cephaloleia saundersii
- Cephaloleia schmidti
- Cephaloleia scitulus
- Cephaloleia semivittata
- Cephaloleia separata
- Cephaloleia simplex
- Cephaloleia simoni
- Cephaloleia splendida
- Cephaloleia stainesi
- Cephaloleia steinhauseni
- Cephaloleia stenosoma
- Cephaloleia stevensi
- Cephaloleia strandi
- Cephaloleia striata
- Cephaloleia suaveola
- Cephaloleia succincta
- Cephaloleia subdepressa
- Cephaloleia susanae
- Cephaloleia suturalis
- Cephaloleia tarsata
- Cephaloleia tenella
- Cephaloleia tetraspilota
- Cephaloleia teutonica
- Cephaloleia thiemei
- Cephaloleia trilineata
- Cephaloleia triangularis
- Cephaloleia trimaculata
- Cephaloleia trivittata
- Cephaloleia tucumana
- Cephaloleia turrialbana
- Cephaloleia uhmanni
- Cephaloleia unctula
- Cephaloleia uniguttata
- Cephaloleia variabilis
- Cephaloleia vicina
- Cephaloleia vittata
- Cephaloleia vittipennis
- Cephaloleia waterhousei
- Cephaloleia weisei
- Cephaloleia whitei
- Cephaloleia zikani

== Selected former species ==
- Cephaloleia aeneipennis
- Cephaloleia cyanea
- Cephaloleia delectabilis
- Cephaloleia dilatata
- Cephaloleia formosa
- Cephaloleia gilvipes
- Cephaloleia gracilis
- Cephaloleia sulciceps
- Cephaloleia truncatipennis
- Cephaloleia vagelineata
