= Homalispa =

Scientific classification
- Kingdom: Animalia
- Phylum: Arthropoda
- Clade: Pancrustacea
- Class: Insecta
- Order: Coleoptera
- Suborder: Polyphaga
- Infraorder: Cucujiformia
- Family: Chrysomelidae
- Subfamily: Cassidinae
- Tribe: Imatidiini
- Genus: Homalispa; Baly, 1858

Genus of leaf beetles

Homalispa is a genus of beetles belonging to the family Chrysomelidae.

== Species ==
- Homalispa apicalis
- Homalispa armata
- Homalispa balyi
- Homalispa batesii
- Homalispa coeruleipennis
- Homalispa cribripennis
- Homalispa cyanipennis
- Homalispa deyrollei
- Homalispa diversipes
- Homalispa egena
- Homalispa grayella
- Homalispa javeti
- Homalispa marginata
- Homalispa mendax
- Homalispa nevermanni
- Homalispa reticulata
- Homalispa signata
- Homalispa tibiella
- Homalispa variabilis
- Homalispa vespertina
- Homalispa wallisi

== Selected former species ==
- Homalispa cimicoides
- Homalispa collaris
- Homalispa gracilis
- Homalispa limbifera
- Homalispa miniacea
- Homalispa subelongata
- Homalispa sulcicollis
