= Euxema =

Scientific classification
- Kingdom: Animalia
- Phylum: Arthropoda
- Clade: Pancrustacea
- Class: Insecta
- Order: Coleoptera
- Suborder: Polyphaga
- Infraorder: Cucujiformia
- Family: Chrysomelidae
- Subfamily: Cassidinae
- Tribe: Imatidiini
- Genus: Euxema; Baly, 1885
- Species: E. insignis

Binomial name
- Euxema insignis Baly, 1885

Genus of beetles

Euxema is a genus of leaf beetles in the family Chrysomelidae. It is monotypic, being represented by the single species, Euxema insignis, which is found in Panama.

== Description ==
Adults resemble Xenispa species in general appearance.

== Biology ==
Although the biology is unknown, specimens have been collected in high montane cloud forests. Similar species from the genus Xenispa that also live in these areas are associated with Chusquea species.

== Taxonomy ==
There have been two species in this genus since 1934 when Maurice Pic placed Euxema elongata in Euxema. However, this species was moved to a new genus, Katkispa in 2014.
