= Xenispa elegans =

Scientific classification
- Kingdom: Animalia
- Phylum: Arthropoda
- Clade: Pancrustacea
- Class: Insecta
- Order: Coleoptera
- Suborder: Polyphaga
- Infraorder: Cucujiformia
- Family: Chrysomelidae
- Genus: Xenispa
- Species: X. elegans

Binomial name
- Xenispa elegans (Baly, 1875)

Synonyms
- Demotispa elegans Uhmann, 1930

Species of beetle

Xenispa elegans is a species of beetle of the family Chrysomelidae. It is found in Ecuador.

== Biology ==
The food plant is unknown.

== Taxonomy ==
Xenispa elegans was synonymized with Xenispa cyanipennis by Spaeth in 1938. However, it was removed from synonymy based on the colour of the antennae, which are uniform yellow in cyanipennis, while they are bicolorous in elegans. Furthermore, elegans has coarser punctation and is somewhat narrower.
