= Lechispa =

Scientific classification
- Kingdom: Animalia
- Phylum: Arthropoda
- Clade: Pancrustacea
- Class: Insecta
- Order: Coleoptera
- Suborder: Polyphaga
- Infraorder: Cucujiformia
- Family: Chrysomelidae
- Subfamily: Cassidinae
- Tribe: Imatidiini
- Genus: Lechispa; Sekerka, 2014

Genus of leaf beetles

Lechispa is a genus of beetles belonging to the family Chrysomelidae.

== Species ==
- Lechispa parallela (Pic, 1930)
- Lechispa rosariana (Maulik, 1933)

== Taxonomy ==
Both species were previously placed in Stenispa.
