= Cyclantispa =

Scientific classification
- Kingdom: Animalia
- Phylum: Arthropoda
- Clade: Pancrustacea
- Class: Insecta
- Order: Coleoptera
- Suborder: Polyphaga
- Infraorder: Cucujiformia
- Family: Chrysomelidae
- Subfamily: Cassidinae
- Tribe: Imatidiini
- Genus: Cyclantispa; Sekerka, 2014

Genus of leaf beetles

Cyclantispa is a genus of beetles belonging to the family Chrysomelidae.

== Species ==
- Cyclantispa gracilis (Baly, 1885)
- Cyclantispa subelongata (Pic, 1936)

== Taxonomy ==
Both species were previously placed in the genus Homalispa.

== Etymology ==
The genus is named after its association with Cyclanthaceae and the name is derived from that plant family name plus the generic name Hispa in reference to its relationships.
