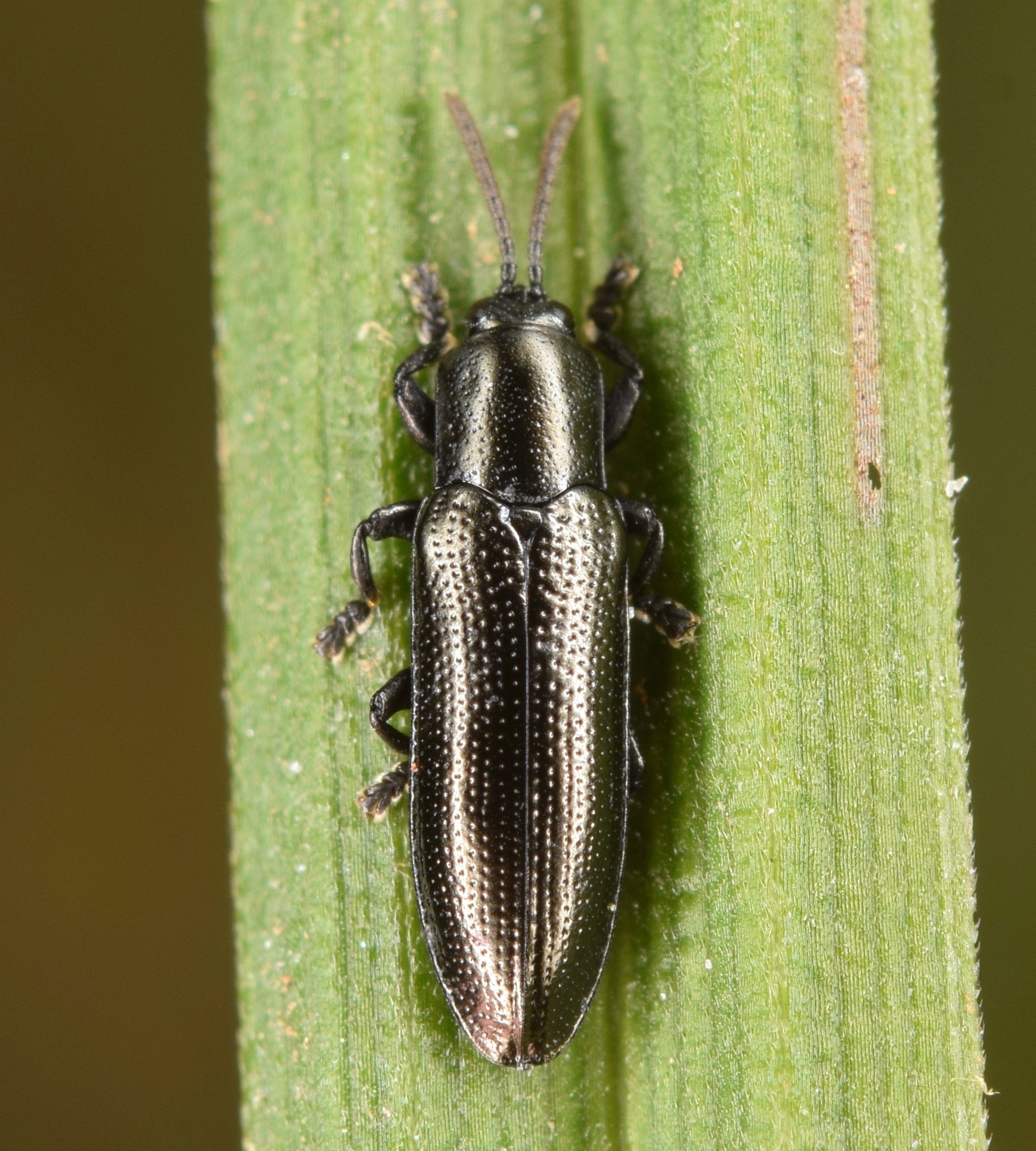
- Stenispa metallica

Scientific classification
- Kingdom: Animalia
- Phylum: Arthropoda
- Clade: Pancrustacea
- Class: Insecta
- Order: Coleoptera
- Suborder: Polyphaga
- Infraorder: Cucujiformia
- Family: Chrysomelidae
- Tribe: Imatidiini
- Genus: Stenispa; Baly, 1858

= Stenispa =

Genus of beetles

Stenispa is a genus of tortoise beetles and hispines in the family Chrysomelidae. There are at least 20 described species in Stenispa.

== Species ==
- Stenispa attenuata Baly, 1877
- Stenispa batesii Baly, 1858
- Stenispa brevicornis Baly, 1885
- Stenispa clarkella Baly, 1858
- Stenispa collaris Baly, 1858
- Stenispa elongata Pic, 1922
- Stenispa gemignanii Monrós and Viana, 1947
- Stenispa graminicola Uhmann, 1939
- Stenispa guatemalensis Uhmann, 1930
- Stenispa metallica (Fabricius, 1801)
- Stenispa minasensis (Pic, 1931)
- Stenispa parryi Baly, 1858
- Stenispa peruana Uhmann, 1930
- Stenispa proxima Monrós and Viana, 1947
- Stenispa robusticollis Pic, 1922
- Stenispa sallei Baly, 1858
- Stenispa sulcatifrons Pic, 1928
- Stenispa vespertina Baly, 1877
- Stenispa vianai Uhmann, 1938
- Stenispa vicina Baly, 1858
- Stenispa viridis (Pic, 1931)

== Former species ==
- Stenispa parallela Pic, 1930
- Stenispa rosariana Maulik, 1933
