= Imatidium rufiventre =

Scientific classification
- Kingdom: Animalia
- Phylum: Arthropoda
- Clade: Pancrustacea
- Class: Insecta
- Order: Coleoptera
- Suborder: Polyphaga
- Infraorder: Cucujiformia
- Family: Chrysomelidae
- Genus: Imatidium
- Species: I. rufiventre

Binomial name
- Imatidium rufiventre (Boheman, 1850)

Synonyms
- Himatidium rufiventre Boheman, 1850

Species of beetle

Imatidium rufiventre is a species of beetle of the family Chrysomelidae. It is found in Bolivia, Brazil, Costa Rica, Ecuador, Panama and Peru.

== Life history ==
The recorded host plant for this species is Inga marginata.
