= Xanthispa =

Scientific classification
- Kingdom: Animalia
- Phylum: Arthropoda
- Clade: Pancrustacea
- Class: Insecta
- Order: Coleoptera
- Suborder: Polyphaga
- Infraorder: Cucujiformia
- Family: Chrysomelidae
- Subfamily: Cassidinae
- Tribe: Imatidiini
- Genus: Xanthispa; Baly, 1858

Genus of leaf beetles

Xanthispa is a genus of beetles belonging to the family Chrysomelidae.

== Species ==
- Xanthispa cimicoides (Guérin-Méneville, 1844)
- Xanthispa miniacea (Blanchard, 1843)

== Taxonomy ==
Julius Weise considered Xanthispa to be a subgenus of Homalispa, and this classification was used until Xanthispa was restored to genus status in 2014.
