= Stenispa attenuata =

Scientific classification
- Kingdom: Animalia
- Phylum: Arthropoda
- Clade: Pancrustacea
- Class: Insecta
- Order: Coleoptera
- Suborder: Polyphaga
- Infraorder: Cucujiformia
- Family: Chrysomelidae
- Genus: Stenispa
- Species: S. attenuata

Binomial name
- Stenispa attenuata Baly, 1877

Species of beetle

Stenispa attenuata is a species of beetle of the family Chrysomelidae. It is found in Guatemala and Panama, where it has been recorded from virgin forests at high elevations.

== Description ==
Adults are similar to Stenispa sallei, but larger and more brightly coloured. Also, the emargination of the anal segment of the abdomen in the male is deeper and more distinctly angulate.

== Biology ==
The food plant is unknown.
