= Stenispa gemignanii =

Scientific classification
- Kingdom: Animalia
- Phylum: Arthropoda
- Clade: Pancrustacea
- Class: Insecta
- Order: Coleoptera
- Suborder: Polyphaga
- Infraorder: Cucujiformia
- Family: Chrysomelidae
- Genus: Stenispa
- Species: S. gemignanii

Binomial name
- Stenispa gemignanii Monrós and Viana, 1947

Species of beetle

Stenispa gemignanii is a species of beetle of the family Chrysomelidae. It is found in Argentina and Brazil.

== Life history ==
The recorded host plants of this species are Cyperaceae species.
