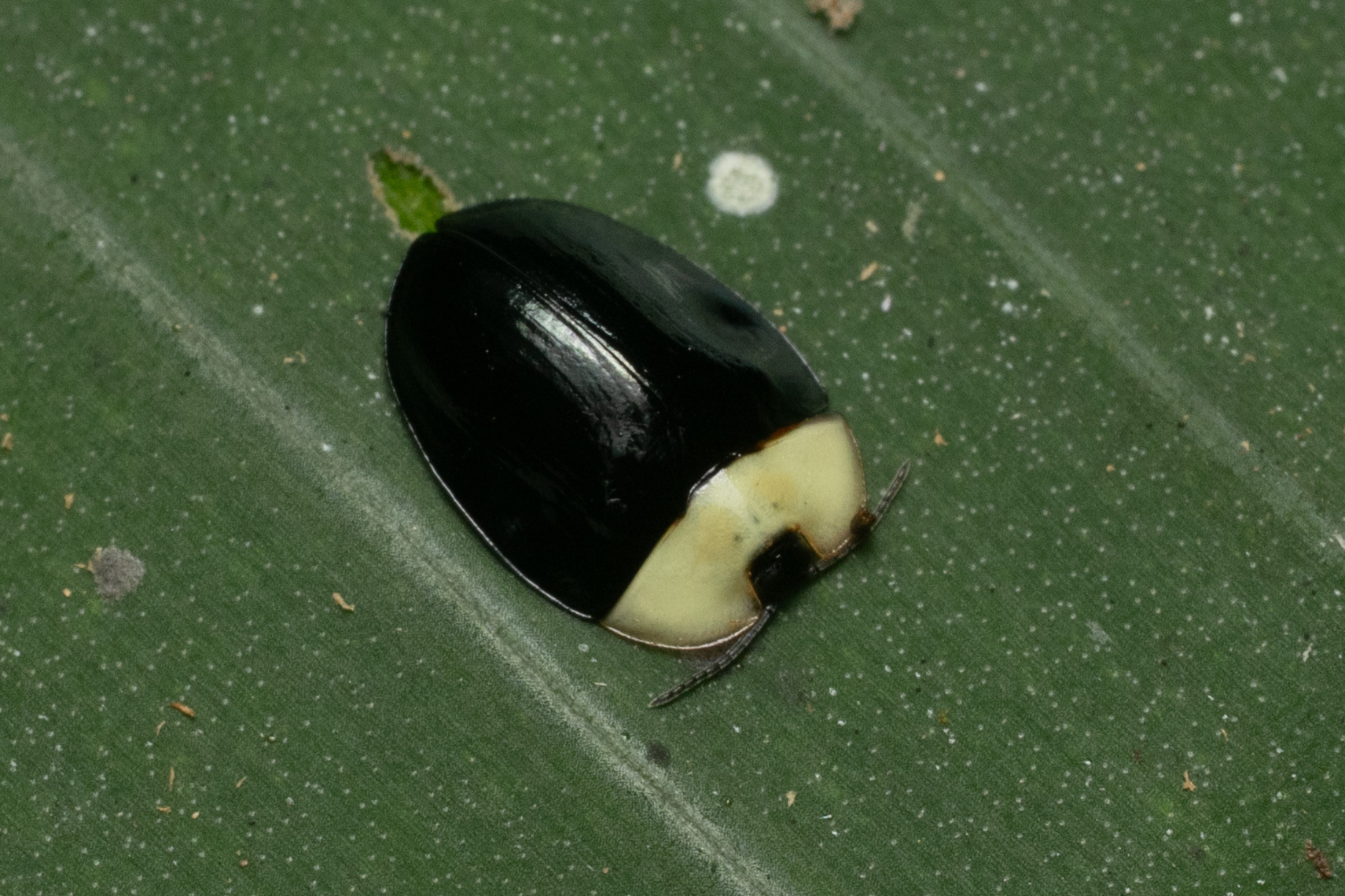
- Imatidium thoracicum

Scientific classification
- Kingdom: Animalia
- Phylum: Arthropoda
- Clade: Pancrustacea
- Class: Insecta
- Order: Coleoptera
- Suborder: Polyphaga
- Infraorder: Cucujiformia
- Family: Chrysomelidae
- Subfamily: Cassidinae
- Tribe: Imatidiini
- Genus: Imatidium; Fabricius, 1801

Synonyms
- Himatidiella Aslam, 1966; Himatidium

= Imatidium =

Genus of leaf beetles

Imatidium is a genus of beetles belonging to the family Chrysomelidae.

== Species ==
- Imatidium acutangulum
- Imatidium banghaasi
- Imatidium buckleyi
- Imatidium chalybaeum
- Imatidium collare
- Imatidium compressum
- Imatidium exiguum
- Imatidium fallax
- Imatidium nigrum
- Imatidium rufiventre
- Imatidium rufomarginatum
- Imatidium sublaevigatum
- Imatidium thoracicum
- Imatidium validicorne
