= Pseudostilpnaspis curvipes =

Scientific classification
- Kingdom: Animalia
- Phylum: Arthropoda
- Clade: Pancrustacea
- Class: Insecta
- Order: Coleoptera
- Suborder: Polyphaga
- Infraorder: Cucujiformia
- Family: Chrysomelidae
- Genus: Pseudostilpnaspis
- Species: P. curvipes

Binomial name
- Pseudostilpnaspis curvipes (Uhmann, 1951)

Synonyms
- Demotispa curvipes Uhmann, 1951; Parimatidium curvipes

Species of beetle

Pseudostilpnaspis curvipes is a species of beetle of the family Chrysomelidae. It is found in Venezuela.

== Life history ==
No host plant has been documented for this species.
