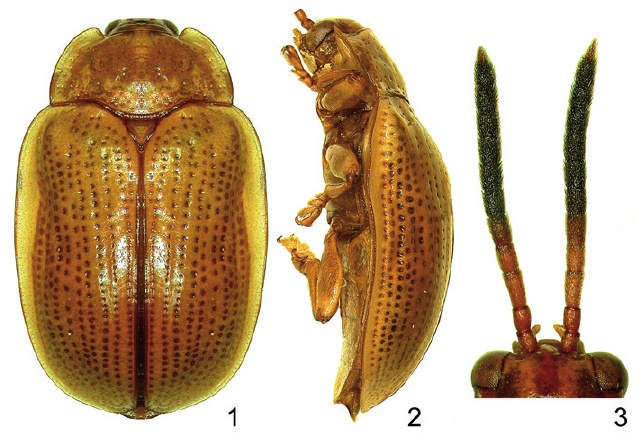
- Holotype of pseudostilpnaspis belizensis

Scientific classification
- Kingdom: Animalia
- Phylum: Arthropoda
- Clade: Pancrustacea
- Class: Insecta
- Order: Coleoptera
- Suborder: Polyphaga
- Infraorder: Cucujiformia
- Family: Chrysomelidae
- Subfamily: Cassidinae
- Tribe: Imatidiini
- Genus: Pseudostilpnaspis; Borowiec, 2000

= Pseudostilpnaspis =

Genus of leaf beetles

Pseudostilpnaspis is a genus of beetles belonging to the family Chrysomelidae.

== Species ==
- Pseudostilpnaspis belizensis Borowiec, 2008
- Pseudostilpnaspis columbica (Weise, 1910)
- Pseudostilpnaspis costaricana Borowiec, 2000
- Pseudostilpnaspis curvipes (Uhmann, 1951)
- Pseudostilpnaspis lata (Baly, 1885)
- Pseudostilpnaspis muzoensis Borowiec, 2000
