= Homalispa balyi =

Scientific classification
- Kingdom: Animalia
- Phylum: Arthropoda
- Clade: Pancrustacea
- Class: Insecta
- Order: Coleoptera
- Suborder: Polyphaga
- Infraorder: Cucujiformia
- Family: Chrysomelidae
- Genus: Homalispa
- Species: H. balyi

Binomial name
- Homalispa balyi Weise, 1910

Synonyms
- Xanthispa caeruleipennis Baly, 1885 (preocc.)

Species of beetle

Homalispa balyi is a species of beetle of the family Chrysomelidae. It is found in Nicaragua.

== Description ==
The antennae are half the length of the body. The thorax is transverse, the sides regularly rounded and converging from the base to the apex, the anterior angles obtuse and the apical margin concave. The is disc is impunctate and the lateral margin is reflexed. The scutellum is pentangular. The elytra are broadly ovate, rounded on the sides, more broadly rounded at the apex, with the outer margin minutely serrulate. The disc is slightly convex, flattened along the suture, broadly excavated laterally before the middle and rather strongly punctate-striate. The striae on the outer disc are sulcate, their interspaces thickened, here and there distinctly costate. The outer limb is reflexed, its surface concave, impunctate.

== Biology ==
The food plant is unknown.
