= Stenispa proxima =

Scientific classification
- Kingdom: Animalia
- Phylum: Arthropoda
- Clade: Pancrustacea
- Class: Insecta
- Order: Coleoptera
- Suborder: Polyphaga
- Infraorder: Cucujiformia
- Family: Chrysomelidae
- Genus: Stenispa
- Species: S. proxima

Binomial name
- Stenispa proxima Monrós and Viana, 1947

Species of beetle

Stenispa proxima is a species of beetle of the family Chrysomelidae. It is found in Argentina.

== Life history ==
The recorded host plant for this species is Scirpus giganteus.
