= Spaethaspis lloydi =

Scientific classification
- Kingdom: Animalia
- Phylum: Arthropoda
- Class: Insecta
- Order: Coleoptera
- Suborder: Polyphaga
- Infraorder: Cucujiformia
- Family: Chrysomelidae
- Genus: Spaethaspis
- Species: S. lloydi

Binomial name
- Spaethaspis lloydi Hincks, 1952

Species of beetle

Spaethaspis lloydi is a species of beetle of the family Chrysomelidae. It is found in Ecuador.

== Life history ==
No host plant has been documented for this species.
