= Xenispa fouquei =

Scientific classification
- Kingdom: Animalia
- Phylum: Arthropoda
- Clade: Pancrustacea
- Class: Insecta
- Order: Coleoptera
- Suborder: Polyphaga
- Infraorder: Cucujiformia
- Family: Chrysomelidae
- Genus: Xenispa
- Species: X. fouquei

Binomial name
- Xenispa fouquei Sekerka, 2017

Species of beetle

Xenispa fouquei is a species of rolled-leaf beetle in the family Chrysomelidae. It is found in Venezuela.

== Description ==
Adults reach a length of about 5.8–7.2 mm. They have a yellow head and pronotum, while the elytron is dark metallic blue.

== Biology ==
Specimens were collected on bamboo.

== Etymology ==
The species is named for René Fouquè, a friend of the author and an entomologist who was a specialist on the tenebrionid tribe Stenosini.
