= Imatidium exiguum =

Scientific classification
- Kingdom: Animalia
- Phylum: Arthropoda
- Clade: Pancrustacea
- Class: Insecta
- Order: Coleoptera
- Suborder: Polyphaga
- Infraorder: Cucujiformia
- Family: Chrysomelidae
- Genus: Imatidium
- Species: I. exiguum

Binomial name
- Imatidium exiguum (Spaeth, 1922)

Synonyms
- Himatidium exiguum Spaeth, 1922

Species of beetle

Imatidium exiguum is a species of beetle of the family Chrysomelidae. It is found in Brazil (Pará) and Colombia.

== Life history ==
No host plant has been documented for this species.
