= Xenispa =

Scientific classification
- Kingdom: Animalia
- Phylum: Arthropoda
- Clade: Pancrustacea
- Class: Insecta
- Order: Coleoptera
- Suborder: Polyphaga
- Infraorder: Cucujiformia
- Family: Chrysomelidae
- Subfamily: Cassidinae
- Tribe: Imatidiini
- Genus: Xenispa; Baly, 1858

Genus of leaf beetles

Xenispa is a genus of beetles belonging to the family Chrysomelidae.

== Species ==
- Xenispa aeneipennis
- Xenispa argentina
- Xenispa atra
- Xenispa baeri
- Xenispa bahiana
- Xenispa bicolorata
- Xenispa boliviana
- Xenispa carinata
- Xenispa collaris
- Xenispa columbica
- Xenispa consobrina
- Xenispa costaricensis
- Xenispa cyanipennis
- Xenispa elegans
- Xenispa exigua
- Xenispa fallaciosa
- Xenispa fouquei
- Xenispa fulvimana
- Xenispa garleppi
- Xenispa germaini
- Xenispa gilvipes
- Xenispa grayella
- Xenispa ovatula
- Xenispa plaumanni
- Xenispa pulchella
- Xenispa pygidialis
- Xenispa romani
- Xenispa scutellaris
- Xenispa sulcicollis
- Xenispa testaceicornis
- Xenispa tibialis
- Xenispa tricolor
- Xenispa uhmanni
- Xenispa zikani

== Taxonomy ==
It was long treated as a synonym of Demotispa and later Parimatidium, but was restored to genus status in 2014.
