= Spaethaspis =

Scientific classification
- Kingdom: Animalia
- Phylum: Arthropoda
- Clade: Pancrustacea
- Class: Insecta
- Order: Coleoptera
- Suborder: Polyphaga
- Infraorder: Cucujiformia
- Family: Chrysomelidae
- Subfamily: Cassidinae
- Tribe: Imatidiini
- Genus: Spaethaspis; Hincks, 1952

Genus of leaf beetles

Spaethaspis is a genus of Neotropical leaf beetles belonging to the tribe Imatidiini.

== Species ==
- Spaethaspis lloydi Hincks, 1952
- Spaethaspis peruviana Borowiec, 2000
