= Xenispa fulvimana =

Scientific classification
- Kingdom: Animalia
- Phylum: Arthropoda
- Clade: Pancrustacea
- Class: Insecta
- Order: Coleoptera
- Suborder: Polyphaga
- Infraorder: Cucujiformia
- Family: Chrysomelidae
- Genus: Xenispa
- Species: X. fulvimana

Binomial name
- Xenispa fulvimana (Pic, 1923)

Synonyms
- Demothispa fulvimana Pic, 1923; Stilpnaspis fulvimana

Species of beetle

Xenispa fulvimana is a species of beetle of the family Chrysomelidae. It is found in Brazil (Goiás).

== Life history ==
No host plant has been documented for this species.
