= Xenispa costaricensis =

Scientific classification
- Kingdom: Animalia
- Phylum: Arthropoda
- Clade: Pancrustacea
- Class: Insecta
- Order: Coleoptera
- Suborder: Polyphaga
- Infraorder: Cucujiformia
- Family: Chrysomelidae
- Genus: Xenispa
- Species: X. costaricensis

Binomial name
- Xenispa costaricensis (Uhmann, 1930)

Synonyms
- Cephalolia costaricensis Uhmann, 1930; Parimatidium costaricensis

Species of beetle

Xenispa costaricensis is a species of beetle of the family Chrysomelidae. It is found in Costa Rica and Panama.

== Biology ==
The recorded food plant is Chusquea simpliciflora.
