= Xenispa garleppi =

Scientific classification
- Kingdom: Animalia
- Phylum: Arthropoda
- Clade: Pancrustacea
- Class: Insecta
- Order: Coleoptera
- Suborder: Polyphaga
- Infraorder: Cucujiformia
- Family: Chrysomelidae
- Genus: Xenispa
- Species: X. garleppi

Binomial name
- Xenispa garleppi (Uhmann, 1937)

Synonyms
- Demothispa garleppi Uhmann, 1937; Parimatidium garleppi

Species of beetle

Xenispa garleppi is a species of beetle of the family Chrysomelidae. It is found in Bolivia and Peru.

== Life history ==
No host plant has been documented for this species.
