= Weiseispa peruana =

Scientific classification
- Kingdom: Animalia
- Phylum: Arthropoda
- Clade: Pancrustacea
- Class: Insecta
- Order: Coleoptera
- Suborder: Polyphaga
- Infraorder: Cucujiformia
- Family: Chrysomelidae
- Genus: Weiseispa
- Species: W. peruana

Binomial name
- Weiseispa peruana (Weise, 1910)

Synonyms
- Demothispa peruana Weise, 1910; Stilpnaspis peruana; Demothispa peruana chr. membrata Uhmann, 1957; Stilpnaspis membrata

Species of beetle

Weiseispa peruana is a species of beetle of the family Chrysomelidae. It is found in Peru and possibly Colombia, Ecuador and Bolivia.

== Life history ==
No host plant has been documented for this species.
