= Xenispa columbica =

Scientific classification
- Kingdom: Animalia
- Phylum: Arthropoda
- Clade: Pancrustacea
- Class: Insecta
- Order: Coleoptera
- Suborder: Polyphaga
- Infraorder: Cucujiformia
- Family: Chrysomelidae
- Genus: Xenispa
- Species: X. columbica

Binomial name
- Xenispa columbica (Weise, 1910)

Synonyms
- Demothispa columbica Weise, 1910; Parimatidium columbica

Species of beetle

Xenispa columbica is a species of beetle of the family Chrysomelidae. It is found in Colombia.

== Biology ==
The food plant is unknown.
