= Pseudostilpnaspis costaricana =

Scientific classification
- Kingdom: Animalia
- Phylum: Arthropoda
- Clade: Pancrustacea
- Class: Insecta
- Order: Coleoptera
- Suborder: Polyphaga
- Infraorder: Cucujiformia
- Family: Chrysomelidae
- Genus: Pseudostilpnaspis
- Species: P. costaricana

Binomial name
- Pseudostilpnaspis costaricana Borowiec, 2000

Species of beetle

Pseudostilpnaspis costaricana is a species of beetle of the family Chrysomelidae. It is found in Costa Rica.

== Description ==
Adults reach a length of about 4.4 mm. The head, pronotum and explanate margin of the elytra are yellowish, while the elytral disc is slightly darker yellowish-red. The legs are yellowish. The six basal segments of the antennae are yellowish-red, while segment 7 is infuscate. The other segments are missing in the holotype.

== Life history ==
No host plant has been documented for this species.

== Etymology ==
The species is named after the type location, Costa Rica.
