= Stenispa collaris =

Scientific classification
- Kingdom: Animalia
- Phylum: Arthropoda
- Clade: Pancrustacea
- Class: Insecta
- Order: Coleoptera
- Suborder: Polyphaga
- Infraorder: Cucujiformia
- Family: Chrysomelidae
- Genus: Stenispa
- Species: S. collaris

Binomial name
- Stenispa collaris Baly, 1858

Species of beetle

Stenispa collaris, the bicolored smooth hispine, is a species of beetle of the family Chrysomelidae. It is found in the United States (Arkansas, Indiana, Iowa, Kansas, Louisiana, Michigan, New York, Oklahoma, South Carolina, Texas).

== Description ==
Adults are narrowly elongate, cylindrical and shining black, while the thorax is bright red and the elytra are cupreo-aeneous.

== Life history ==
No host plant has been documented for this species, but adults have been collected under dry leaves beneath Salix species.
