= Xenispa romani =

Scientific classification
- Kingdom: Animalia
- Phylum: Arthropoda
- Clade: Pancrustacea
- Class: Insecta
- Order: Coleoptera
- Suborder: Polyphaga
- Infraorder: Cucujiformia
- Family: Chrysomelidae
- Genus: Xenispa
- Species: X. romani

Binomial name
- Xenispa romani (Weise, 1921)

Synonyms
- Demothispa romani Weise, 1921; Parimatidium romani

Species of beetle

Xenispa romani is a species of beetle of the family Chrysomelidae. It is found in Brazil (Amazonas).

== Life history ==
No host plant has been documented for this species.
