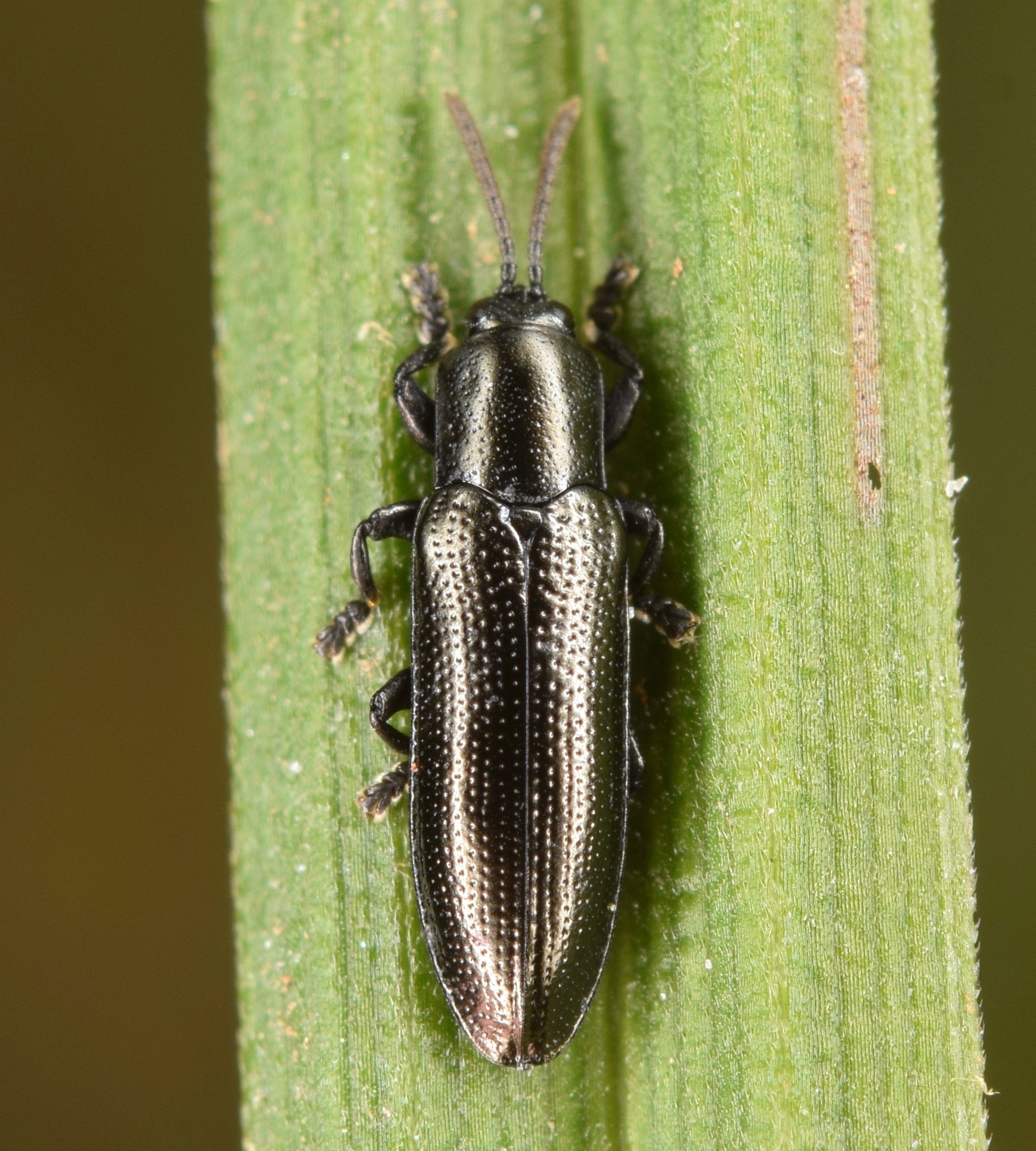

Scientific classification
- Kingdom: Animalia
- Phylum: Arthropoda
- Clade: Pancrustacea
- Class: Insecta
- Order: Coleoptera
- Suborder: Polyphaga
- Infraorder: Cucujiformia
- Family: Chrysomelidae
- Genus: Stenispa
- Species: S. metallica

Binomial name
- Stenispa metallica (Fabricius, 1801)

Synonyms
- Hispa metallica Fabricius, 1801; Languria brevicollis Randall, 1838

= Stenispa metallica =

Species of beetle

Stenispa metallica is a species of tortoise beetle or hispine in the family Chrysomelidae. It is found in Central America and North America, where it has been recorded from the United States (Alabama, Connecticut, District of Columbia, Florida, Georgia, Illinois, Indiana, Iowa, Kansas, Kentucky, Louisiana, Maryland, Massachusetts, Michigan, Minnesota, Mississippi, Missouri, Nebraska, New Jersey, New York, North Carolina, Ohio, Oklahoma, Pennsylvania, Rhode Island, South Carolina, South Dakota, Tennessee, Texas, Virginia, West Virginia, Wisconsin) and Mexico (Tamaulipas).

== Description ==
Adults are shining black, with an obscure metallic tinge. The thorax is scarcely longer than broad, the sides parallel, indistinctly sinuate, the anterior angles slightly produced and obtuse, and the posterior acute, above subcylindrical, finely but distinctly punctured, the punctures not very crowded. The scutellum is pentangular. The elytra are scarcely broader than the thorax, nearly four times its length, the sides narrowly margined, subsinuate, narrowed behind towards their apex, the latter in each elytron rounded, conjointly slightly emarginate at the suture. The sutural angle above is convex, distinctly punctate-striate. Beneath distinct and shining black.

== Life history ==
The recorded host plant for this species is Scirpus atrovirens. Furthermore, adults have been collected on Carex stricta, Carex hyalinolepis, Andropogon virginicus and Spartina species.
