= Xenispa tibialis =

Scientific classification
- Kingdom: Animalia
- Phylum: Arthropoda
- Clade: Pancrustacea
- Class: Insecta
- Order: Coleoptera
- Suborder: Polyphaga
- Infraorder: Cucujiformia
- Family: Chrysomelidae
- Genus: Xenispa
- Species: X. tibialis

Binomial name
- Xenispa tibialis (Baly, 1858)

Synonyms
- Demotispa tibialis Baly, 1858; Parimatidium tibialis

Species of beetle

Xenispa tibialis is a species of beetle of the family Chrysomelidae. It is found in Brazil.

== Life history ==
No host plant has been documented for this species.
