= Pseudostilpnaspis lata =

Scientific classification
- Kingdom: Animalia
- Phylum: Arthropoda
- Clade: Pancrustacea
- Class: Insecta
- Order: Coleoptera
- Suborder: Polyphaga
- Infraorder: Cucujiformia
- Family: Chrysomelidae
- Genus: Pseudostilpnaspis
- Species: P. lata

Binomial name
- Pseudostilpnaspis lata (Baly, 1885)

Synonyms
- Cephaloleia lata Baly, 1885; Demotispa lata

Species of beetle

Pseudostilpnaspis lata is a species of beetle of the family Chrysomelidae. It is found in Panama. The species has also been recorded from Costa Rica, Mexico and Nicaragua, but these reports are likely based on misidentications.

== Life history ==
The recorded host plants for this species are Chamaedorea tepejilote and Chamaedorea wendlandiana.
