= Homalispa marginata =

Scientific classification
- Kingdom: Animalia
- Phylum: Arthropoda
- Clade: Pancrustacea
- Class: Insecta
- Order: Coleoptera
- Suborder: Polyphaga
- Infraorder: Cucujiformia
- Family: Chrysomelidae
- Genus: Homalispa
- Species: H. marginata

Binomial name
- Homalispa marginata Baly, 1858

Species of beetle

Homalispa marginata is a species of beetle of the family Chrysomelidae. It is found in Peru.

== Description ==
Adults are elongate-ovate, depressed above and pale shining fulvous. The head is smooth and the eyes and antennae are blackish-fuscous, the latter with the two basal joints, the third beneath, and the extreme apex of the terminal one obscure fulvous. The thorax is nearly one-half broader than long, the sides margined, reflexed, straight and parallel behind, rounded and narrowed in front, the anterior angles produced. The apical margin is deeply sinuate on either side, its middle produced into an obtuse lobe. The elytra are ovate, broader than the thorax, the sides margined, minutely serrate towards their apex.

== Life history ==
No host plant has been documented for this species.
