= Stenispa parryi =

Scientific classification
- Kingdom: Animalia
- Phylum: Arthropoda
- Clade: Pancrustacea
- Class: Insecta
- Order: Coleoptera
- Suborder: Polyphaga
- Infraorder: Cucujiformia
- Family: Chrysomelidae
- Genus: Stenispa
- Species: S. parryi

Binomial name
- Stenispa parryi Baly, 1858

Species of beetle

Stenispa parryi is a species of beetle of the family Chrysomelidae. It is found in Brazil.

== Description ==
Adults are filiform, convex above, and shining metallic blue with a greenish tinge.

== Life history ==
No host plant has been documented for this species.
