= Stenispa vespertina =

Scientific classification
- Kingdom: Animalia
- Phylum: Arthropoda
- Clade: Pancrustacea
- Class: Insecta
- Order: Coleoptera
- Suborder: Polyphaga
- Infraorder: Cucujiformia
- Family: Chrysomelidae
- Genus: Stenispa
- Species: S. vespertina

Binomial name
- Stenispa vespertina Baly, 1877

Species of beetle

Stenispa vespertina is a species of beetle of the family Chrysomelidae. It is found in Brazil (Bahia).

== Life history ==
The recorded host plants for this species are Cyperus species.
