= Homalispa nevermanni =

Scientific classification
- Kingdom: Animalia
- Phylum: Arthropoda
- Clade: Pancrustacea
- Class: Insecta
- Order: Coleoptera
- Suborder: Polyphaga
- Infraorder: Cucujiformia
- Family: Chrysomelidae
- Genus: Homalispa
- Species: H. nevermanni

Binomial name
- Homalispa nevermanni Uhmann, 1930

Species of beetle

Homalispa nevermanni is a species of beetle of the family Chrysomelidae. It is found in Costa Rica and Ecuador.

== Life history ==
The recorded host plant for this species is Oenocarpus panamanus.
