= Xenispa argentina =

Scientific classification
- Kingdom: Animalia
- Phylum: Arthropoda
- Clade: Pancrustacea
- Class: Insecta
- Order: Coleoptera
- Suborder: Polyphaga
- Infraorder: Cucujiformia
- Family: Chrysomelidae
- Genus: Xenispa
- Species: X. argentina

Binomial name
- Xenispa argentina (Monrós & Viana, 1947)

Synonyms
- Demothispa argentina Monrós & Viana, 1947; Stilpnaspis argentina

Species of beetle

Xenispa argentina is a species of beetle of the family Chrysomelidae. It is found in Argentina.

== Description ==
Adults are similar to other Xenispa species, but have a yellow dorsum, while all other species have at least the elytron black or metallic blue.
