= Melanispa =

Scientific classification
- Kingdom: Animalia
- Phylum: Arthropoda
- Clade: Pancrustacea
- Class: Insecta
- Order: Coleoptera
- Suborder: Polyphaga
- Infraorder: Cucujiformia
- Family: Chrysomelidae
- Subfamily: Cassidinae
- Tribe: Imatidiini
- Genus: Melanispa; Baly, 1858

Genus of leaf beetles

Melanispa is a genus of beetles belonging to the family Chrysomelidae.

== Species ==
- Melanispa truncata Baly, 1858
- Melanispa bicolor Zayas, 1960

== Taxonomy ==
Melanispa bicolor is known to not belong to this genus, but further study is needed to determine its correct placement.
