= Homalispa deyrollei =

Scientific classification
- Kingdom: Animalia
- Phylum: Arthropoda
- Clade: Pancrustacea
- Class: Insecta
- Order: Coleoptera
- Suborder: Polyphaga
- Infraorder: Cucujiformia
- Family: Chrysomelidae
- Genus: Homalispa
- Species: H. deyrollei

Binomial name
- Homalispa deyrollei Baly, 1858

Species of beetle

Homalispa deyrollei is a species of beetle of the family Chrysomelidae. It is found in Brazil.

== Description ==
Adults are elongate-ovate, depressed and pale shining yellow. The antennae (except for the entire first and the bases of the two following joints), eyes, elytra, pleurae and abdomen are black. The head is smooth. The thorax is rather more than half broader than long at its base, with the sides rounded, much narrowed towards their apex, slightly so at their base, their outer border, together with the basal margin near the posterior angles, broadly reflexed. The apical margin is deeply sinuate on either side, its middle portion convex. The anterior angles are acute, the posterior armed with an indistinct tooth. The elytra are rather broader than the base of the thorax, narrowly ovate, the sides slightly, their apex regularly rounded. The sutural angle is obtuse and the margin narrowly dilated, the outer edge slightly reflexed, finely serrate, serratures distant and nearly obsolete along the sides, crowded and more distinct towards the apex.

== Life history ==
The recorded host plants for this species are Lasiacis divaricata and Olyra latifolia.
