= Xenispa ovatula =

Scientific classification
- Kingdom: Animalia
- Phylum: Arthropoda
- Clade: Pancrustacea
- Class: Insecta
- Order: Coleoptera
- Suborder: Polyphaga
- Infraorder: Cucujiformia
- Family: Chrysomelidae
- Genus: Xenispa
- Species: X. ovatula

Binomial name
- Xenispa ovatula (Uhmann, 1948)

Synonyms
- Demotispa ovatula Uhmann, 1948; Parimatidium ovatula

Species of beetle

Xenispa ovatula is a species of beetle of the family Chrysomelidae. It is found in Brazil (Rio de Janeiro).

== Life history ==
No host plant has been documented for this species.
