= Xenispa uhmanni =

Scientific classification
- Kingdom: Animalia
- Phylum: Arthropoda
- Clade: Pancrustacea
- Class: Insecta
- Order: Coleoptera
- Suborder: Polyphaga
- Infraorder: Cucujiformia
- Family: Chrysomelidae
- Genus: Xenispa
- Species: X. uhmanni

Binomial name
- Xenispa uhmanni (Pic, 1934)

Synonyms
- Demothispa uhmanni Pic, 1934; Parimatidium uhmanni

Species of beetle

Xenispa uhmanni is a species of beetle of the family Chrysomelidae. It is found in Colombia.

== Life history ==
No host plant has been documented for this species.
