= Pseudostilpnaspis muzoensis =

Scientific classification
- Kingdom: Animalia
- Phylum: Arthropoda
- Clade: Pancrustacea
- Class: Insecta
- Order: Coleoptera
- Suborder: Polyphaga
- Infraorder: Cucujiformia
- Family: Chrysomelidae
- Genus: Pseudostilpnaspis
- Species: P. muzoensis

Binomial name
- Pseudostilpnaspis muzoensis Borowiec, 2000

Species of beetle

Pseudostilpnaspis muzoensis is a species of beetle of the family Chrysomelidae. It is found in Colombia and Panama. The species has also been recorded from Costa Rica, Mexico and Nicaragua, but these reports are likely based on misidentications.

== Description ==
Adults reach a length of about 4.9-5.3 mm. The head and pronotum are yellow, while the elytra are yellowish-red to pale red, with a slightly paler explanate margin. The legs are yellow to yellowish-red. Segments 1, 2 and 11 of the antennae are yellow, while segments 3–10 are infuscate.

== Life history ==
No host plant has been documented for this species.

== Etymology ==
The species is named after the type location, Muzo in Colombia.
