= Xenispa plaumanni =

Scientific classification
- Kingdom: Animalia
- Phylum: Arthropoda
- Clade: Pancrustacea
- Class: Insecta
- Order: Coleoptera
- Suborder: Polyphaga
- Infraorder: Cucujiformia
- Family: Chrysomelidae
- Genus: Xenispa
- Species: X. plaumanni

Binomial name
- Xenispa plaumanni (Uhmann, 1937)

Synonyms
- Demothispa plaumanni Uhmann, 1937; Parimatidium plaumanni

Species of beetle

Xenispa plaumanni is a species of beetle of the family Chrysomelidae. It is found in Brazil (Rio Grande do Sul, Santa Catarina, São Paulo) and Paraguay.

== Life history ==
No host plant has been documented for this species.
