= Melanispa truncata =

Scientific classification
- Kingdom: Animalia
- Phylum: Arthropoda
- Clade: Pancrustacea
- Class: Insecta
- Order: Coleoptera
- Suborder: Polyphaga
- Infraorder: Cucujiformia
- Family: Chrysomelidae
- Genus: Melanispa
- Species: M. truncata

Binomial name
- Melanispa truncata Baly, 1858

Species of beetle

Melanispa truncata is a species of beetle of the family Chrysomelidae. It is found in Guadeloupe.

== Description ==
Adults are oblong-elongate, flattened above and shining black, with the apex of the elytra broadly truncate.

== Life history ==
No host plant has been documented for this species.
