= Xenispa fallaciosa =

Scientific classification
- Kingdom: Animalia
- Phylum: Arthropoda
- Clade: Pancrustacea
- Class: Insecta
- Order: Coleoptera
- Suborder: Polyphaga
- Infraorder: Cucujiformia
- Family: Chrysomelidae
- Genus: Xenispa
- Species: X. fallaciosa

Binomial name
- Xenispa fallaciosa (Pic, 1923)

Synonyms
- Demotispa fallaciosa Pic, 1923

Species of beetle

Xenispa fallaciosa is a species of beetle of the family Chrysomelidae. It is found in Peru.

== Life history ==
No host plant has been documented for this species.
