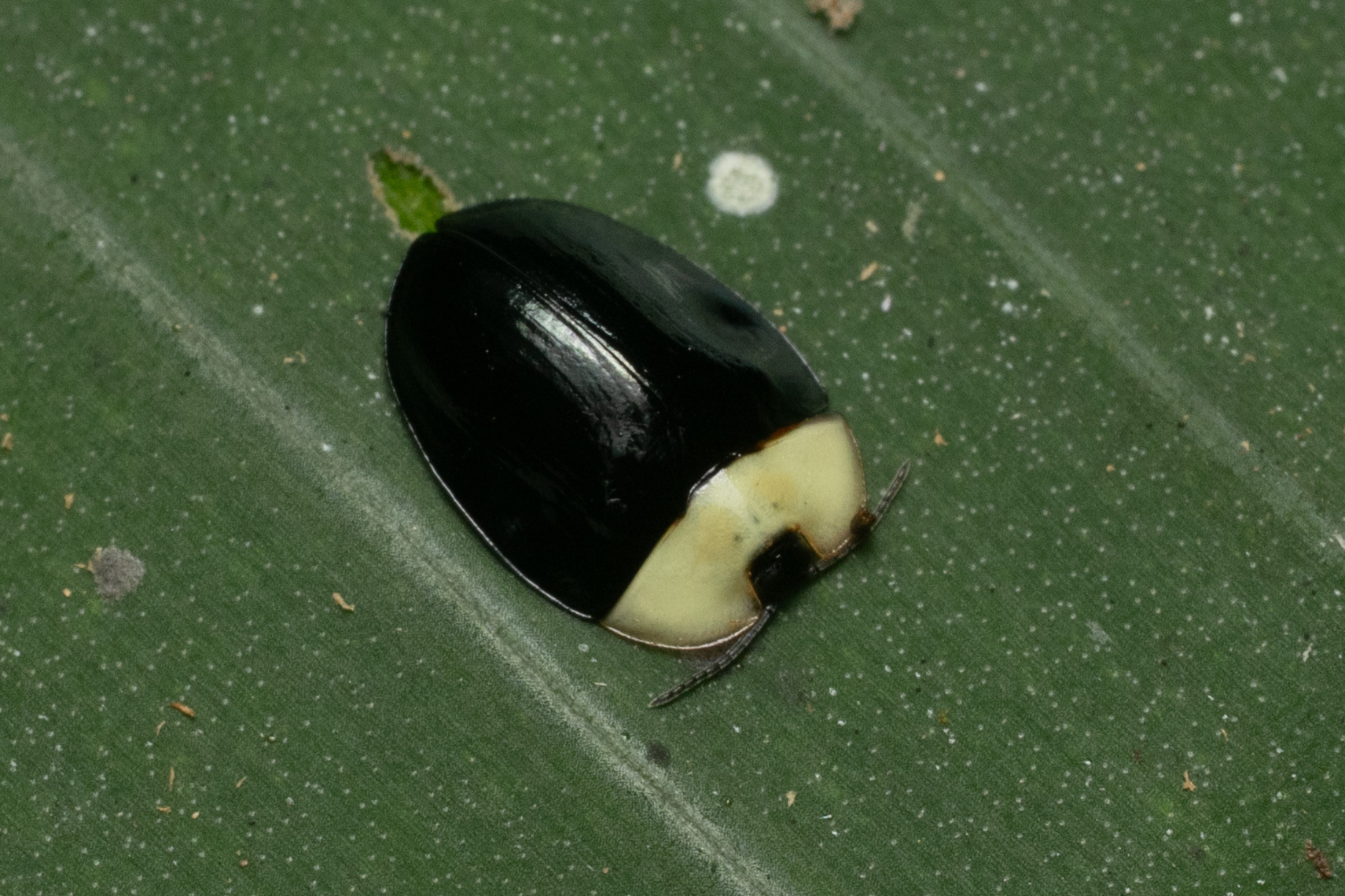

Scientific classification
- Kingdom: Animalia
- Phylum: Arthropoda
- Clade: Pancrustacea
- Class: Insecta
- Order: Coleoptera
- Suborder: Polyphaga
- Infraorder: Cucujiformia
- Family: Chrysomelidae
- Genus: Imatidium
- Species: I. thoracicum

Binomial name
- Imatidium thoracicum Fabricius, 1801

Synonyms
- Cassida albicolle Olivier, 1808

= Imatidium thoracicum =

Species of beetle

Imatidium thoracicum is a species of beetle in the family Chrysomelidae. It is found in Bolivia, Brazil, Colombia, Costa Rica, Ecuador, French Guiana, Nicaragua, Panama, Peru, Trinidad and Venezuela.

== Life history ==
The recorded host plants for this species are Calathea insignis, Calathea ovate, Calathea virginalis, Calathea lutena, Heliconia latispatha, Heliconia catheta, Heliconia irrasa and Heliconia wagneriana.
