= Windsorispa submarginata =

Scientific classification
- Kingdom: Animalia
- Phylum: Arthropoda
- Clade: Pancrustacea
- Class: Insecta
- Order: Coleoptera
- Suborder: Polyphaga
- Infraorder: Cucujiformia
- Family: Chrysomelidae
- Genus: Windsorispa
- Species: W. submarginata

Binomial name
- Windsorispa submarginata (Pic, 1934)

Synonyms
- Demothispa submarginata Pic, 1934

Species of beetle

Windsorispa submarginata is a species of beetle of the family Chrysomelidae. It is found in Venezuela.

== Life history ==
No host plant has been documented for this species.
