= Stenispa vianai =

Scientific classification
- Kingdom: Animalia
- Phylum: Arthropoda
- Clade: Pancrustacea
- Class: Insecta
- Order: Coleoptera
- Suborder: Polyphaga
- Infraorder: Cucujiformia
- Family: Chrysomelidae
- Genus: Stenispa
- Species: S. vianai

Binomial name
- Stenispa vianai Uhmann, 1938

Species of beetle

Stenispa vianai is a species of beetle of the family Chrysomelidae. It is found in Argentina and Brazil.

== Life history ==
The recorded host plant for this species is Scirpus giganteus.
