= Imatidium rufomarginatum =

Scientific classification
- Kingdom: Animalia
- Phylum: Arthropoda
- Clade: Pancrustacea
- Class: Insecta
- Order: Coleoptera
- Suborder: Polyphaga
- Infraorder: Cucujiformia
- Family: Chrysomelidae
- Genus: Imatidium
- Species: I. rufomarginatum

Binomial name
- Imatidium rufomarginatum (Boheman, 1850)

Synonyms
- Himatidium rufomarginatum Boheman, 1850

Species of beetle

Imatidium rufomarginatum is a species of beetle of the family Chrysomelidae. It is found in Mexico.

== Life history ==
No host plant has been documented for this species.
