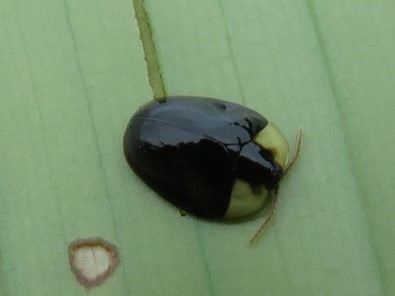

Scientific classification
- Kingdom: Animalia
- Phylum: Arthropoda
- Clade: Pancrustacea
- Class: Insecta
- Order: Coleoptera
- Suborder: Polyphaga
- Infraorder: Cucujiformia
- Family: Chrysomelidae
- Genus: Imatidium
- Species: I. collare

Binomial name
- Imatidium collare (Herbst, 1799)

Synonyms
- Cassida collare Herbst, 1799; Imatidium lineola Fabricius, 1801; Cassida pallipes Olivier, 1808

= Imatidium collare =

Species of beetle

Imatidium collare is a species of beetle in the family Chrysomelidae. It is found in Brazil (Amapá), French Guiana and Suriname.

== Life history ==
No host plant has been documented for this species.
