= Xenispa pulchella =

Scientific classification
- Kingdom: Animalia
- Phylum: Arthropoda
- Clade: Pancrustacea
- Class: Insecta
- Order: Coleoptera
- Suborder: Polyphaga
- Infraorder: Cucujiformia
- Family: Chrysomelidae
- Genus: Xenispa
- Species: X. pulchella

Binomial name
- Xenispa pulchella Baly, 1858

Synonyms
- Demothispa magna Weise, 1910; Parimatidium magna

Species of beetle

Xenispa pulchella is a species of beetle of the family Chrysomelidae. It is found in Colombia.

== Life history ==
No host plant has been documented for this species.

== Taxonomy ==
Julius Weise synonymized Xenispa with Demotispa in 1910 and proposed the replacement name Demothispa magna for Xenispa pulchella. Since Xenispa was removed from synonymy, the replacement name is no longer necessary.
