= Homalispa armata =

Scientific classification
- Kingdom: Animalia
- Phylum: Arthropoda
- Clade: Pancrustacea
- Class: Insecta
- Order: Coleoptera
- Suborder: Polyphaga
- Infraorder: Cucujiformia
- Family: Chrysomelidae
- Genus: Homalispa
- Species: H. armata

Binomial name
- Homalispa armata Baly, 1858

Species of beetle

Homalispa armata is a species of beetle of the family Chrysomelidae. It is found in Peru.

== Description ==
Adults are ovate, depressed above and shining fulvous. The disc of the elytra is pitchy black. The head is sparingly and minutely punctured, covered with short fine adpressed pale hairs. The thorax is transverse and nearly twice as broad as long at the base, with the sides rounded, narrowed towards their apex, their margin broadly reflexed. The apical margin is deeply sinuate on either side, and armed just within the anterior angles with an obtuse tooth, its middle portion convex. The anterior angles are subacute and the posterior acute, above smooth, remotely and minutely punctate, deeply impressed on either side the disc, canaliculated just within the outer border. The elytra are rather broader than the base of the thorax, with the shoulders rounded, the sides margined, slightly curved, the margin moderately dilated in front, less distinctly so behind.

== Life history ==
No host plant has been documented for this species.
