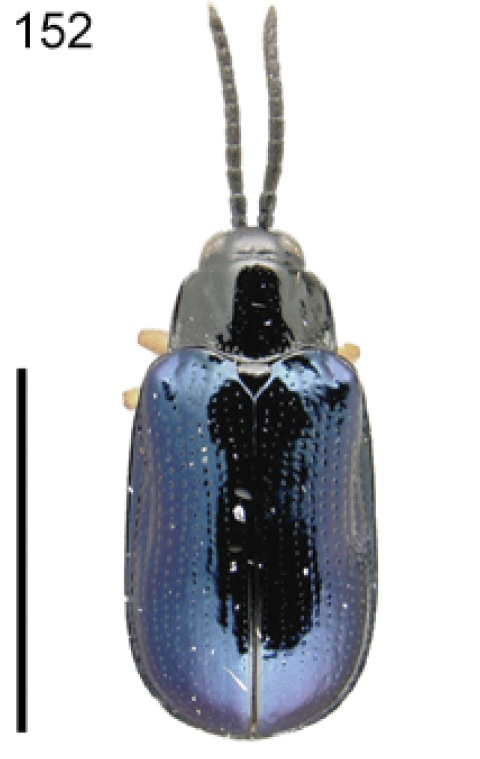

Scientific classification
- Kingdom: Animalia
- Phylum: Arthropoda
- Clade: Pancrustacea
- Class: Insecta
- Order: Coleoptera
- Suborder: Polyphaga
- Infraorder: Cucujiformia
- Family: Chrysomelidae
- Genus: Xenispa
- Species: X. gilvipes

Binomial name
- Xenispa gilvipes (Uhmann, 1930)

Synonyms
- Cephaloleia gilvipes Uhmann, 1930

= Xenispa gilvipes =

Species of beetle

Xenispa gilvipes is a species of beetle of the family Chrysomelidae. It is found in Costa Rica.

== Description ==
Adults reach a length of about 4.5 mm. Adults are metallic blue, with the legs, antennae and mouthparts yellow.
