= Xenispa carinata =

Scientific classification
- Kingdom: Animalia
- Phylum: Arthropoda
- Clade: Pancrustacea
- Class: Insecta
- Order: Coleoptera
- Suborder: Polyphaga
- Infraorder: Cucujiformia
- Family: Chrysomelidae
- Genus: Xenispa
- Species: X. carinata

Binomial name
- Xenispa carinata (Pic, 1934)

Synonyms
- Demotispa carinata Pic, 1934

Species of beetle

Xenispa carinata is a species of beetle of the family Chrysomelidae. It is found in Venezuela.

== Biology ==
The food plant is unknown.
