= Stenispa brevicornis =

Scientific classification
- Kingdom: Animalia
- Phylum: Arthropoda
- Clade: Pancrustacea
- Class: Insecta
- Order: Coleoptera
- Suborder: Polyphaga
- Infraorder: Cucujiformia
- Family: Chrysomelidae
- Genus: Stenispa
- Species: S. brevicornis

Binomial name
- Stenispa brevicornis Baly, 1885

Species of beetle

Stenispa brevicornis is a species of beetle of the family Chrysomelidae. It is found in Mexico.

== Description ==
The antennae are moderately robust and equal in length to the head and thorax. The front is concave and rather closely punctured. The thorax is rather longer than broad, the sides straight and parallel, incurved at the extreme apex. The hinder angles are acute, while the anterior ones are produced anteriorly into an acute tooth. The disc is transversely convex, faintly impressed transversely in front of the scutellum, the surface minutely granulose, subremotely punctured. The elytra are elongate, rather broader than the thorax, the sides straight and parallel before their middle, then gradually attenuated to the apex, the apical margin obsoletely serrulate. The disc is regularly punctate-striate, the puncturing nearly obsolete near the apex. The interspaces are minutely granulose.

== Biology ==
The food plant is unknown.
