= Stenispa robusticollis =

Scientific classification
- Kingdom: Animalia
- Phylum: Arthropoda
- Clade: Pancrustacea
- Class: Insecta
- Order: Coleoptera
- Suborder: Polyphaga
- Infraorder: Cucujiformia
- Family: Chrysomelidae
- Genus: Stenispa
- Species: S. robusticollis

Binomial name
- Stenispa robusticollis Pic, 1922

Species of beetle

Stenispa robusticollis is a species of beetle of the family Chrysomelidae. It is found in Brazil (Goiás).

== Life history ==
No host plant has been documented for this species.
