= Stenispa sulcatifrons =

Scientific classification
- Kingdom: Animalia
- Phylum: Arthropoda
- Clade: Pancrustacea
- Class: Insecta
- Order: Coleoptera
- Suborder: Polyphaga
- Infraorder: Cucujiformia
- Family: Chrysomelidae
- Genus: Stenispa
- Species: S. sulcatifrons

Binomial name
- Stenispa sulcatifrons Pic, 1928

Species of beetle

Stenispa sulcatifrons is a species of beetle of the family Chrysomelidae. It is found in Argentina.

== Life history ==
The recorded host plants for this species are Cyperaceae species.
