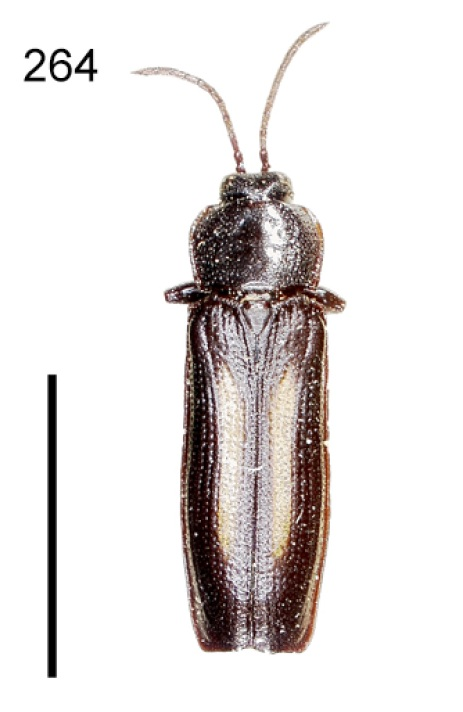

Scientific classification
- Kingdom: Animalia
- Phylum: Arthropoda
- Clade: Pancrustacea
- Class: Insecta
- Order: Coleoptera
- Suborder: Polyphaga
- Infraorder: Cucujiformia
- Family: Chrysomelidae
- Genus: Parentispa
- Species: P. vagelineata

Binomial name
- Parentispa vagelineata (Pic, 1926)

Synonyms
- Cephaloleia vagelineata Pic, 1926

= Parentispa vagelineata =

Species of beetle

Parentispa vagelineata is a species of beetle of the family Chrysomelidae. It is found in Brazil (Goiás, Matto Grosso) and Colombia.

== Description ==
Adults reach a length of about 4.9–5 mm. Adults are black, the pronotum margined in red. The elytron has a broad Y-shaped yellow vitta on the disc and the lateral margins are red.

== Biology ==
The recorded host plants are Elaeis guineensis, Corozo oleifera, Cocos nucifera and Astrocaryum chonta.
