= Windsorispa =

Scientific classification
- Kingdom: Animalia
- Phylum: Arthropoda
- Clade: Pancrustacea
- Class: Insecta
- Order: Coleoptera
- Suborder: Polyphaga
- Infraorder: Cucujiformia
- Family: Chrysomelidae
- Subfamily: Cassidinae
- Tribe: Imatidiini
- Genus: Windsorispa; Sekerka, 2014

Genus of leaf beetles

Windsorispa is a genus of beetles belonging to the Chrysomelidae family.

== Species ==
- Windsorispa latifrons (Weise, 1910)
- Windsorispa submarginata (Pic, 1934)

== Former species ==
- Windsorispa bicoloricornis (Pic, 1926)

== Etymology ==
This genus is dedicated to a friend of the author and specialist in Cassidinae, Don Windsor. The name is derived from his surname and generic name Hispa.
