= Homalispa signata =

Scientific classification
- Kingdom: Animalia
- Phylum: Arthropoda
- Clade: Pancrustacea
- Class: Insecta
- Order: Coleoptera
- Suborder: Polyphaga
- Infraorder: Cucujiformia
- Family: Chrysomelidae
- Genus: Homalispa
- Species: H. signata

Binomial name
- Homalispa signata Pic, 1926

Species of beetle

Homalispa signata is a species of beetle of the family Chrysomelidae. It is found in Argentina.

== Life history ==
No host plant has been documented for this species.
