= Weiseispa cayenensis =

Scientific classification
- Kingdom: Animalia
- Phylum: Arthropoda
- Clade: Pancrustacea
- Class: Insecta
- Order: Coleoptera
- Suborder: Polyphaga
- Infraorder: Cucujiformia
- Family: Chrysomelidae
- Genus: Weiseispa
- Species: W. cayenensis

Binomial name
- Weiseispa cayenensis (Pic, 1923)

Synonyms
- Demothispa cayenensis Pic, 1923

Species of beetle

Weiseispa cayenensis is a species of beetle of the family Chrysomelidae. It is found in French Guiana.

== Life history ==
No host plant has been documented for this species.
