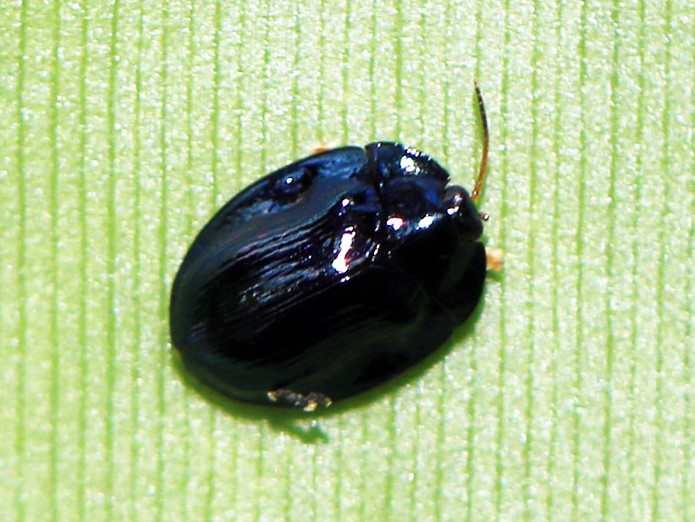

Scientific classification
- Kingdom: Animalia
- Phylum: Arthropoda
- Clade: Pancrustacea
- Class: Insecta
- Order: Coleoptera
- Suborder: Polyphaga
- Infraorder: Cucujiformia
- Family: Chrysomelidae
- Genus: Imatidium
- Species: I. banghaasi

Binomial name
- Imatidium banghaasi (Spaeth, 1907)

Synonyms
- Himatidium banghaasi Spaeth, 1907

= Imatidium banghaasi =

Species of beetle

Imatidium banghaasi is a species of beetle in the family Chrysomelidae. It is found in Peru.

== Life history ==
No host plant has been documented for this species.
