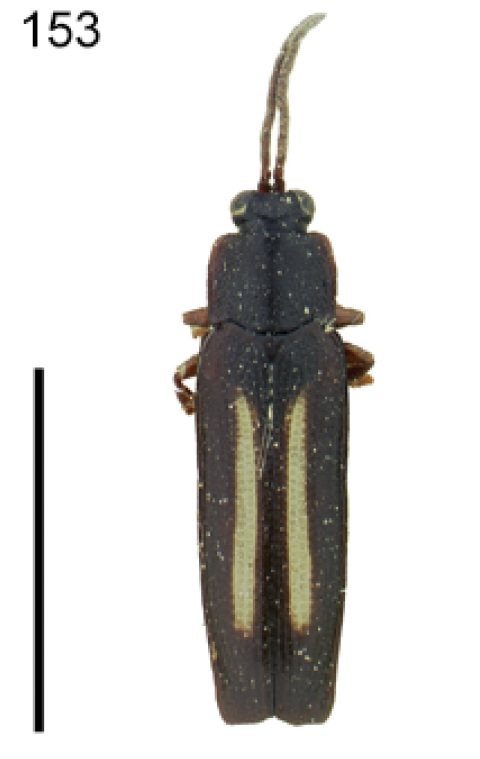

Scientific classification
- Kingdom: Animalia
- Phylum: Arthropoda
- Clade: Pancrustacea
- Class: Insecta
- Order: Coleoptera
- Suborder: Polyphaga
- Infraorder: Cucujiformia
- Family: Chrysomelidae
- Genus: Parentispa
- Species: P. gracilis

Binomial name
- Parentispa gracilis Baly, 1878

Synonyms
- Cephaloleia gracilis Baly, 1878

= Parentispa gracilis =

Species of beetle

Parentispa gracilis is a species of beetle of the family Chrysomelidae. It is found in Brazil (Amazonas).

== Description ==
Adults reach a length of about 4.5 mm. Adults are dark chestnut brown, the elytron with an ivory white vitta. The basal five antennomeres are reddish-black, while the rest is black. The legs are reddish.
