= Homalispa vespertina =

Scientific classification
- Kingdom: Animalia
- Phylum: Arthropoda
- Clade: Pancrustacea
- Class: Insecta
- Order: Coleoptera
- Suborder: Polyphaga
- Infraorder: Cucujiformia
- Family: Chrysomelidae
- Genus: Homalispa
- Species: H. vespertina

Binomial name
- Homalispa vespertina Baly, 1858

Synonyms
- Homalispa vespertina donckieri Pic, 1936

Species of beetle

Homalispa vespertina is a species of beetle of the family Chrysomelidae. It is found in French Guiana and Trinidad.

== Life history ==
No host plant has been documented for this species.
