= Melanispa bicolor =

Scientific classification
- Kingdom: Animalia
- Phylum: Arthropoda
- Clade: Pancrustacea
- Class: Insecta
- Order: Coleoptera
- Suborder: Polyphaga
- Infraorder: Cucujiformia
- Family: Chrysomelidae
- Genus: Melanispa
- Species: M. bicolor

Binomial name
- Melanispa bicolor Zayas, 1960

Species of beetle

Melanispa bicolor is a species of beetle of the family Chrysomelidae. It is found in Cuba.

== Life history ==
No host plant has been documented for this species.
