= Xenispa bicolorata =

Scientific classification
- Kingdom: Animalia
- Phylum: Arthropoda
- Clade: Pancrustacea
- Class: Insecta
- Order: Coleoptera
- Suborder: Polyphaga
- Infraorder: Cucujiformia
- Family: Chrysomelidae
- Genus: Xenispa
- Species: X. bicolorata

Binomial name
- Xenispa bicolorata (Uhmann, 1948)

Synonyms
- Demotispa bicolorata Uhmann, 1948; Parimatidium bicolorata

Species of beetle

Xenispa bicolorata is a species of beetle of the family Chrysomelidae. It is found in Brazil (Santa Catarina) and possibly Ecuador and Paraguay.

== Biology ==
The food plant is unknown.
