= Imatidium buckleyi =

Scientific classification
- Kingdom: Animalia
- Phylum: Arthropoda
- Clade: Pancrustacea
- Class: Insecta
- Order: Coleoptera
- Suborder: Polyphaga
- Infraorder: Cucujiformia
- Family: Chrysomelidae
- Genus: Imatidium
- Species: I. buckleyi

Binomial name
- Imatidium buckleyi (Spaeth, 1928)

Synonyms
- Himatidium buckleyi Spaeth, 1928

Species of beetle

Imatidium buckleyi is a species of beetle of the family Chrysomelidae. It is found in Ecuador.

== Life history ==
No host plant has been documented for this species.
