= Weiseispa angusticollis =

Scientific classification
- Kingdom: Animalia
- Phylum: Arthropoda
- Clade: Pancrustacea
- Class: Insecta
- Order: Coleoptera
- Suborder: Polyphaga
- Infraorder: Cucujiformia
- Family: Chrysomelidae
- Genus: Weiseispa
- Species: W. angusticollis

Binomial name
- Weiseispa angusticollis (Weise, 1893)

Synonyms
- Demothispa angusticollis Weise, 1893; Stilpnaspis angusticollis

Species of beetle

Weiseispa angusticollis is a species of beetle of the family Chrysomelidae. It is found in Ecuador.

== Life history ==
No host plant has been documented for this species.
