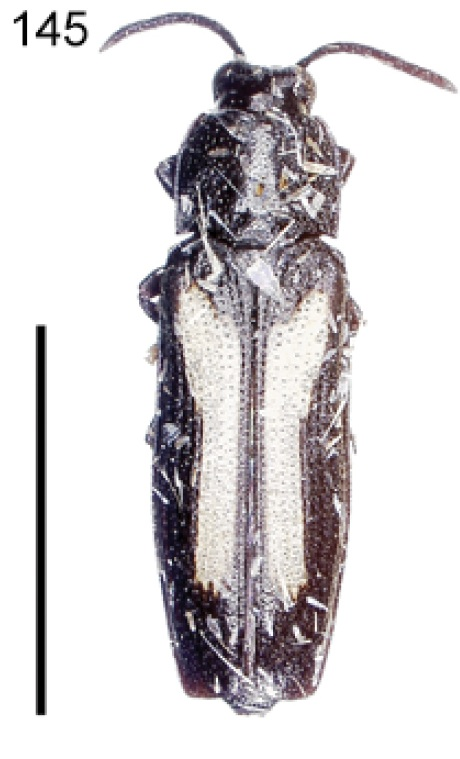

Scientific classification
- Kingdom: Animalia
- Phylum: Arthropoda
- Clade: Pancrustacea
- Class: Insecta
- Order: Coleoptera
- Suborder: Polyphaga
- Infraorder: Cucujiformia
- Family: Chrysomelidae
- Genus: Parentispa
- Species: P. formosa

Binomial name
- Parentispa formosa (Staines, 1996)

Synonyms
- Cephaloleia formosa Staines, 1996

= Parentispa formosa =

Species of beetle

Parentispa formosa is a species of rolled-leaf beetle in the family Chrysomelidae. It is found in Panama and possibly also in Belize and Colombia. The species name is sometimes misspelled as "formosus" (e.g.).

== Description ==
Adults reach a length of about 4.4–5.3 mm. Adults are black with a yellow elytral vitta. The legs are black with yellow tarsi.

== Biology ==
Adults have been collected on Elaeis guineensis.
