= Parimatidium rubrum =

Scientific classification
- Kingdom: Animalia
- Phylum: Arthropoda
- Clade: Pancrustacea
- Class: Insecta
- Order: Coleoptera
- Suborder: Polyphaga
- Infraorder: Cucujiformia
- Family: Chrysomelidae
- Genus: Parimatidium
- Species: P. rubrum

Binomial name
- Parimatidium rubrum (Boheman, 1850)

Synonyms
- Himatidium rubrum Boheman, 1850

Species of beetle

Parimatidium rubrum is a species of beetle of the family Chrysomelidae. It is found in Brazil (Pará, São Paulo), French Guiana and Suriname.

== Life history ==
No host plant has been documented for this species.
