= Stenispa elongata =

Scientific classification
- Kingdom: Animalia
- Phylum: Arthropoda
- Clade: Pancrustacea
- Class: Insecta
- Order: Coleoptera
- Suborder: Polyphaga
- Infraorder: Cucujiformia
- Family: Chrysomelidae
- Genus: Stenispa
- Species: S. elongata

Binomial name
- Stenispa elongata Pic, 1922

Species of beetle

Stenispa elongata is a species of beetle of the family Chrysomelidae. It is found in Brazil (Bahia).

== Life history ==
No host plant has been documented for this species.
