= Imatidium chalybaeum =

Scientific classification
- Kingdom: Animalia
- Phylum: Arthropoda
- Clade: Pancrustacea
- Class: Insecta
- Order: Coleoptera
- Suborder: Polyphaga
- Infraorder: Cucujiformia
- Family: Chrysomelidae
- Genus: Imatidium
- Species: I. chalybaeum

Binomial name
- Imatidium chalybaeum (Boheman, 1850)

Synonyms
- Himatidium chalybaeum Boheman, 1850

Species of beetle

Imatidium chalybaeum is a species of beetle of the family Chrysomelidae. It is found in Brazil (Para).

== Life history ==
No host plant has been documented for this species.
