= Imatidium fallax =

Scientific classification
- Kingdom: Animalia
- Phylum: Arthropoda
- Clade: Pancrustacea
- Class: Insecta
- Order: Coleoptera
- Suborder: Polyphaga
- Infraorder: Cucujiformia
- Family: Chrysomelidae
- Genus: Imatidium
- Species: I. fallax

Binomial name
- Imatidium fallax (Spaeth, 1911)

Synonyms
- Himatidium fallax Spaeth, 1911

Species of beetle

Imatidium fallax is a species of beetle of the family Chrysomelidae. It is found in Colombia.

== Life history ==
No host plant has been documented for this species.
