= Stenispa viridis =

Scientific classification
- Kingdom: Animalia
- Phylum: Arthropoda
- Clade: Pancrustacea
- Class: Insecta
- Order: Coleoptera
- Suborder: Polyphaga
- Infraorder: Cucujiformia
- Family: Chrysomelidae
- Genus: Stenispa
- Species: S. viridis

Binomial name
- Stenispa viridis (Pic, 1931)

Synonyms
- Cephaloleia viridis Pic, 1931

Species of beetle

Stenispa viridis is a species of beetle of the family Chrysomelidae. It is found in Brazil.

== Life history ==
No host plant has been documented for this species.
