= Xenispa consobrina =

Scientific classification
- Kingdom: Animalia
- Phylum: Arthropoda
- Clade: Pancrustacea
- Class: Insecta
- Order: Coleoptera
- Suborder: Polyphaga
- Infraorder: Cucujiformia
- Family: Chrysomelidae
- Genus: Xenispa
- Species: X. consobrina

Binomial name
- Xenispa consobrina (Weise, 1910)

Synonyms
- Demothispa consobrina Weise, 1910

Species of beetle

Xenispa consobrina is a species of beetle of the family Chrysomelidae. It is found in Colombia.

== Biology ==
The food plant is unknown.
