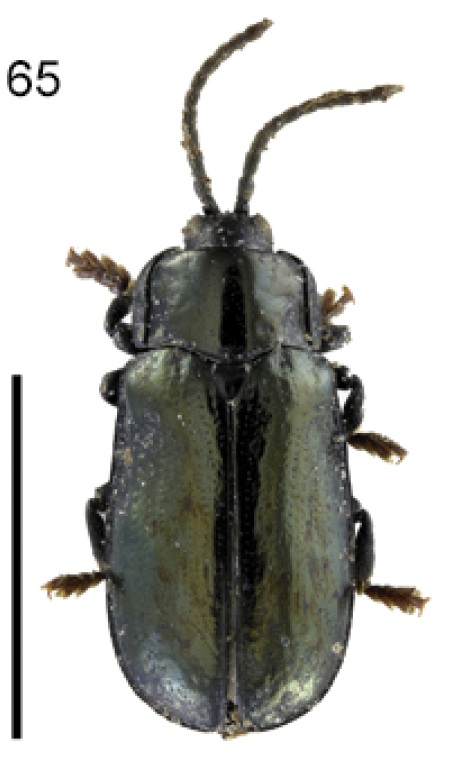

Scientific classification
- Kingdom: Animalia
- Phylum: Arthropoda
- Clade: Pancrustacea
- Class: Insecta
- Order: Coleoptera
- Suborder: Polyphaga
- Infraorder: Cucujiformia
- Family: Chrysomelidae
- Genus: Xenispa
- Species: X. aeneipennis

Binomial name
- Xenispa aeneipennis (Baly, 1858)

Synonyms
- Cephaloleia aeneipennis Baly, 1858

= Xenispa aeneipennis =

Species of beetle

Xenispa aeneipennis is a species of beetle of the family Chrysomelidae. It is found in Venezuela and possibly Colombia.

== Description ==
Adults reach a length of about 4–4.5 mm. Adults are black, often with a golden, bluish or green sheen.
