= Xenispa zikani =

Scientific classification
- Kingdom: Animalia
- Phylum: Arthropoda
- Clade: Pancrustacea
- Class: Insecta
- Order: Coleoptera
- Suborder: Polyphaga
- Infraorder: Cucujiformia
- Family: Chrysomelidae
- Genus: Xenispa
- Species: X. zikani

Binomial name
- Xenispa zikani (Spaeth, 1938)

Synonyms
- Himatidium (Parimatidium) zikani Spaeth, 1938; Parimatidium zikani

Species of beetle

Xenispa zikani is a species of beetle of the family Chrysomelidae. It is found in Brazil (Minas Gerais).

== Life history ==
No host plant has been documented for this species.
