= Homalispa coeruleipennis =

Scientific classification
- Kingdom: Animalia
- Phylum: Arthropoda
- Clade: Pancrustacea
- Class: Insecta
- Order: Coleoptera
- Suborder: Polyphaga
- Infraorder: Cucujiformia
- Family: Chrysomelidae
- Genus: Homalispa
- Species: H. coeruleipennis

Binomial name
- Homalispa coeruleipennis (Guérin-Méneville, 1844)

Synonyms
- Cephaloleia coeruleipennis Guérin-Méneville, 1844; Cephaloleia coeruleipennis laeta Guérin-Méneville, 1844

Species of beetle

Homalispa coeruleipennis is a species of beetle of the family Chrysomelidae. It is found in Colombia, Suriname and Peru.

== Life history ==
No host plant has been documented for this species.
