= Parentispa =

Scientific classification
- Kingdom: Animalia
- Phylum: Arthropoda
- Clade: Pancrustacea
- Class: Insecta
- Order: Coleoptera
- Suborder: Polyphaga
- Infraorder: Cucujiformia
- Family: Chrysomelidae
- Subfamily: Cassidinae
- Tribe: Imatidiini
- Genus: Parentispa; Sekerka, 2014

Genus of leaf beetles

Parentispa is a genus of beetles belonging to the family Chrysomelidae.

== Species ==
- Parentispa gracilis (Baly, 1878)
- Parentispa formosa (Staines, 1996)
- Parentispa vagelineata (Pic, 1926)

== Etymology ==
The genus is dedicated to the parents of the author, Vlasta and Jií Sekerka. The name is derived from Latin parentes (meaning parents) and the generic name Hispa.
