= Spaethaspis peruviana =

Scientific classification
- Kingdom: Animalia
- Phylum: Arthropoda
- Clade: Pancrustacea
- Class: Insecta
- Order: Coleoptera
- Suborder: Polyphaga
- Infraorder: Cucujiformia
- Family: Chrysomelidae
- Genus: Spaethaspis
- Species: S. peruviana

Binomial name
- Spaethaspis peruviana Borowiec, 2000

Species of beetle

Spaethaspis peruviana is a species of beetle of the family Chrysomelidae. It is found in Peru.

== Description ==
Adults reach a length of about 7–8.2 mm. The head, pronotum and scutellum are red, while the margins of the pronotum are yellowish-red. The legs and antennae are uniformly yellow and the elytra are metallic blue.

== Life history ==
No host plant has been documented for this species.

== Etymology ==
The species is named after the type location, Peru.
