= Weiseispa =

Scientific classification
- Kingdom: Animalia
- Phylum: Arthropoda
- Clade: Pancrustacea
- Class: Insecta
- Order: Coleoptera
- Suborder: Polyphaga
- Infraorder: Cucujiformia
- Family: Chrysomelidae
- Subfamily: Cassidinae
- Tribe: Imatidiini
- Genus: Weiseispa; Sekerka, 2014

Genus of leaf beetles

Weiseispa is a genus of beetles belonging to the family Chrysomelidae.

== Species ==
- Weiseispa angusticollis (Weise, 1893)
- Weiseispa bimaculata (Baly, 1858)
- Weiseispa cayenensis (Pic, 1923)
- Weiseispa melancholica (Weise, 1910)
- Weiseispa peruana (Weise, 1910)

== Etymology ==
This genus is dedicated to German leaf beetle specialist Julius Weise. The name is derived from his surname and generic name Hispa.
