= Homalispa batesii =

Scientific classification
- Kingdom: Animalia
- Phylum: Arthropoda
- Clade: Pancrustacea
- Class: Insecta
- Order: Coleoptera
- Suborder: Polyphaga
- Infraorder: Cucujiformia
- Family: Chrysomelidae
- Genus: Homalispa
- Species: H. batesii

Binomial name
- Homalispa batesii Baly, 1858

Species of beetle

Homalispa batesii is a species of beetle of the family Chrysomelidae. It is found in French Guiana and Peru.

== Description ==
Adults are ovate, depressed, above shining yellow; the scutellum and antennae are black and the elytra are bright violaceous. The head is yellow and smooth. The thorax is more than half as broad again as long, the apical margin convex, deeply sinuate on either side and the lateral margin with a reflexed rounded border, narrowed towards the apex and at the extreme base, the anterior angles subacute, the posterior acute. The elytra are broader than the base of the thorax and ovate, the sides slightly and the apex regularly rounded.

== Life history ==
No host plant has been documented for this species.
