= Stenispa guatemalensis =

Scientific classification
- Kingdom: Animalia
- Phylum: Arthropoda
- Clade: Pancrustacea
- Class: Insecta
- Order: Coleoptera
- Suborder: Polyphaga
- Infraorder: Cucujiformia
- Family: Chrysomelidae
- Genus: Stenispa
- Species: S. guatemalensis

Binomial name
- Stenispa guatemalensis Uhmann, 1930

Species of beetle

Stenispa guatemalensis is a species of beetle of the family Chrysomelidae. It is found in Belize, Colombia and Guatemala.

== Life history ==
No host plant has been documented for this species.
