= Pseudostilpnaspis columbica =

Scientific classification
- Kingdom: Animalia
- Phylum: Arthropoda
- Clade: Pancrustacea
- Class: Insecta
- Order: Coleoptera
- Suborder: Polyphaga
- Infraorder: Cucujiformia
- Family: Chrysomelidae
- Genus: Pseudostilpnaspis
- Species: P. columbica

Binomial name
- Pseudostilpnaspis columbica (Weise, 1910)

Synonyms
- Stilpnaspis columbica Weise, 1910

Species of beetle

Pseudostilpnaspis columbica is a species of beetle of the family Chrysomelidae. It is found in Colombia.

== Description ==
Adults reach a length of about 4.4 mm. The head, pronotum and elytra are red, with the explanate margins slightly paler yellowish-red. The legs are also yellowish-red. The three basal segments of the antennae are yellowish-red, while the rest is black (except for the reddish apex of the last segment).

== Life history ==
No host plant has been documented for this species.
