= Xenispa baeri =

Scientific classification
- Kingdom: Animalia
- Phylum: Arthropoda
- Clade: Pancrustacea
- Class: Insecta
- Order: Coleoptera
- Suborder: Polyphaga
- Infraorder: Cucujiformia
- Family: Chrysomelidae
- Genus: Xenispa
- Species: X. baeri

Binomial name
- Xenispa baeri (Pic, 1926)

Synonyms
- Demotispa baeri Pic, 1926

Species of beetle

Xenispa baeri is a species of beetle of the family Chrysomelidae. It is found in Peru.

== Biology ==
The food plant is unknown.
