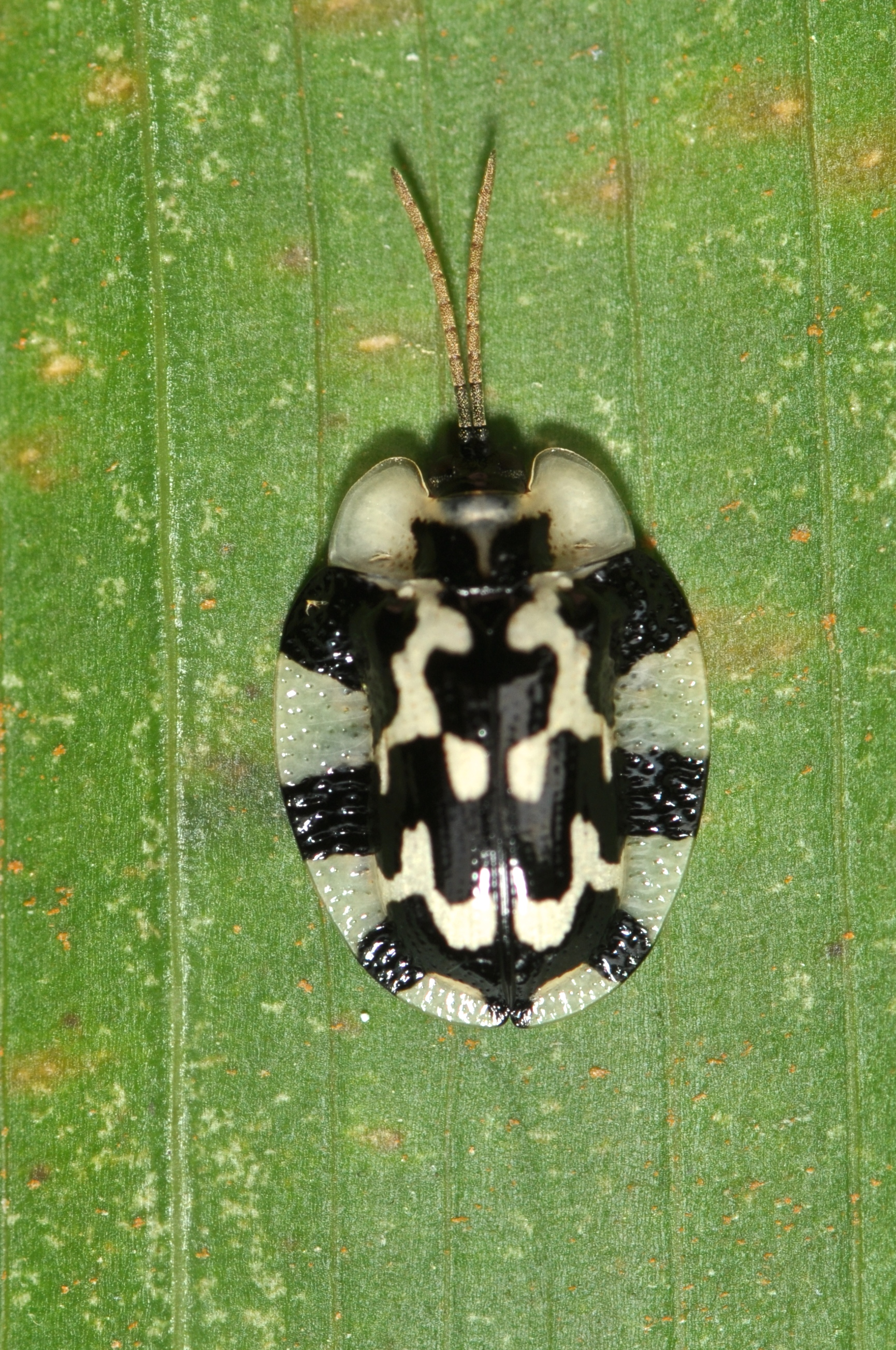
- Aslamidium sp.

Scientific classification
- Kingdom: Animalia
- Phylum: Arthropoda
- Clade: Pancrustacea
- Class: Insecta
- Order: Coleoptera
- Suborder: Polyphaga
- Infraorder: Cucujiformia
- Family: Chrysomelidae
- Subfamily: Cassidinae
- Tribe: Imatidiini; Hope, 1840

Genera
- see text

Synonyms
- Imatidiidae Hope, 1840; Cephaloleites Chapuis, 1875; Himatidiites Chapuis, 1875; Cephaloleiini Weise, 1910; Himatidiitae: Spaeth, 1929; Imatidiini Hincks, 1952

= Imatidiini =

Tribe of leaf beetles

Imatidiini is a tribe of leaf beetles within the subfamily Cassidinae, found mostly in the Americas and Asia; it was erected by Frederick William Hope in 1840.

== Genera ==
1. Aslamidium Borowiec, 1984
2. Calliaspis Dejean, 1837
3. Caloclada Guérin-Méneville, 1844
4. Cephaloleia Chevrolat, 1837
5. Cyclantispa Sekerka, 2014
6. Demotispa Baly, 1858
7. Euxema Baly, 1885
8. Homalispa Baly, 1858
9. Imatidium Fabricius, 1801
10. Katkispa Sekerka, 2014
11. Lechispa Sekerka, 2014
12. Melanispa Baly, 1858
13. Parentispa Sekerka, 2014
14. Parimatidium Spaeth, 1938
15. Pseudimatidium Aslam, 1966
16. Pseudostilpnaspis Borowiec, 2000
17. Serratispa Staines, 2002
18. Spaethaspis Hincks, 1952
19. Stenispa Baly, 1858
20. Weiseispa Sekerka, 2014
21. Windsorispa Sekerka, 2014
22. Xanthispa Baly, 1858
23. Xenispa Baly, 1858

=== Fossil genera ===
- †Cephaloleichnites
- †Denaeaspis Chaboo & Engel, 2009

=== Formerly placed here ===
- Stilpnaspis Weise, 1905 (synonym of Demotispa)
- Cladispa Baly, 1858 (now in Spilophorini)
- Octocladiscus Thomson, 1856 (synonym of Caloclada)
- Solenispa Weise, 1905 (now in Hybosispini)
