= Xenispa testaceicornis =

Scientific classification
- Kingdom: Animalia
- Phylum: Arthropoda
- Clade: Pancrustacea
- Class: Insecta
- Order: Coleoptera
- Suborder: Polyphaga
- Infraorder: Cucujiformia
- Family: Chrysomelidae
- Genus: Xenispa
- Species: X. testaceicornis

Binomial name
- Xenispa testaceicornis (Pic, 1926)

Synonyms
- Demothispa testaceicornis Pic, 1926

Species of beetle

Xenispa testaceicornis is a species of beetle of the family Chrysomelidae. It is found in Peru.

== Life history ==
No host plant has been documented for this species.
