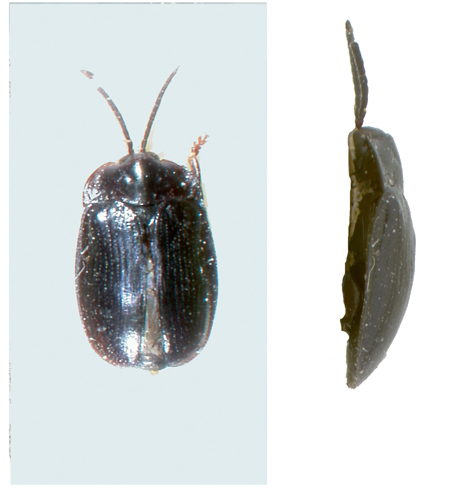

Scientific classification
- Kingdom: Animalia
- Phylum: Arthropoda
- Clade: Pancrustacea
- Class: Insecta
- Order: Coleoptera
- Suborder: Polyphaga
- Infraorder: Cucujiformia
- Family: Chrysomelidae
- Genus: Xenispa
- Species: X. bahiana

Binomial name
- Xenispa bahiana (Spaeth, 1938)

Synonyms
- Himatidium (Parimatidium) bahianum Spaeth, 1938; Parimatidium bahianum

= Xenispa bahiana =

Species of beetle

Xenispa bahiana is a species of beetle of the family Chrysomelidae. It is found in Brazil (Bahia).

== Biology ==
The recorded food plants are Cocos nucifera and Geonoma species.
