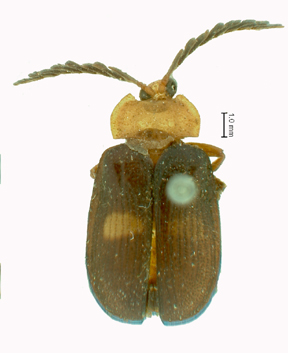

Scientific classification
- Kingdom: Animalia
- Phylum: Arthropoda
- Clade: Pancrustacea
- Class: Insecta
- Order: Coleoptera
- Suborder: Polyphaga
- Infraorder: Cucujiformia
- Family: Chrysomelidae
- Subfamily: Cassidinae
- Tribe: Imatidiini
- Genus: Caloclada; Guérin-Méneville, 1844
- Species: C. fasciata

Binomial name
- Caloclada fasciata (Guérin-Méneville, 1844)

Synonyms
- Cladophora Dejean, 1836 (preocc.); Octocladiscus Thomson, 1856; Cladophora fasciatus Guérin-Méneville, 1844; Caloclada fasciata; Octocladiscus fasciata; Cladophora flabellata Guérin-Méneville, 1844; Caloclada flabellata; Octocladiscus flabellata

= Caloclada =

Genus of beetles

Caloclada is a genus of leaf beetles in the family Chrysomelidae. It is monotypic, being represented by the single species, Caloclada fasciata, which is found in French Guiana.

== Description ==
The antennae show strong sexual dimorphism. In males, the shape of antennomeres 4–10 is pectinate, while it is triangular in females.

== Taxonomy ==
Guérin-Méneville proposed the genus name Caloclada in 1844 as a replacement for Cladophora (Dejean, 1836), which was preoccupied. When establishing the genus, Guérin-Méneville included two species, Caloclada fasciata and Caloclada flabellata. In 1856, Thomson provided a new replacement name (Octocladiscus) for Cladophora. In 1858, Baly synonymised Caloclada with Octocladiscus, retaining the latter as the valid name. However, Caloclada was validly described and thus has priority over Octocladiscus.
