= Xenispa exigua =

Scientific classification
- Kingdom: Animalia
- Phylum: Arthropoda
- Clade: Pancrustacea
- Class: Insecta
- Order: Coleoptera
- Suborder: Polyphaga
- Infraorder: Cucujiformia
- Family: Chrysomelidae
- Genus: Xenispa
- Species: X. exigua

Binomial name
- Xenispa exigua (Uhmann, 1930)

Synonyms
- Cephalolia exigua Uhmann, 1930; Parimatidium exigua

Species of beetle

Xenispa exigua is a species of beetle of the family Chrysomelidae. It is found in Costa Rica and Panama.

== Life history ==
No host plant has been documented for this species.
