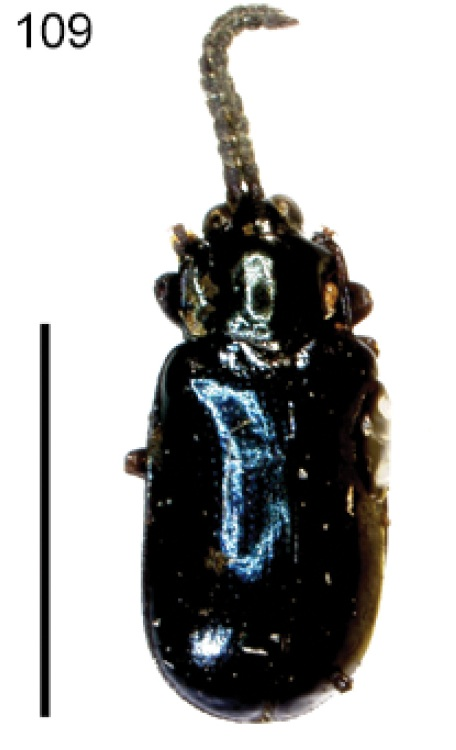

Scientific classification
- Kingdom: Animalia
- Phylum: Arthropoda
- Clade: Pancrustacea
- Class: Insecta
- Order: Coleoptera
- Suborder: Polyphaga
- Infraorder: Cucujiformia
- Family: Chrysomelidae
- Genus: Xenispa
- Species: X. atra

Binomial name
- Xenispa atra (Pic, 1926)

Synonyms
- Demothispa atra Pic, 1926; Cephaloleia cyanea Staines, 1996

= Xenispa atra =

Species of beetle

Xenispa atra is a species of rolled-leaf beetle in the family Chrysomelidae. It is found in Venezuela.

== Description ==
Adults reach a length of about 3.4–4.1 mm. The head, pronotum and scutellum are black, while the elytron is dark metallic blue and the legs are reddish.

== Biology ==
Adults have been collected on Chusquea species.
