= Homalispa apicalis =

Scientific classification
- Kingdom: Animalia
- Phylum: Arthropoda
- Clade: Pancrustacea
- Class: Insecta
- Order: Coleoptera
- Suborder: Polyphaga
- Infraorder: Cucujiformia
- Family: Chrysomelidae
- Genus: Homalispa
- Species: H. apicalis

Binomial name
- Homalispa apicalis Baly, 1858

Species of beetle

Homalispa apicalis is a species of beetle of the family Chrysomelidae. It is found in Peru.

== Description ==
Adults are ovate and shining black. The head is smooth, the vertex with an obscure fulvous stain. The thorax is nearly twice as broad at the base as long, the sides gradually rounded and narrowed towards the front, the outer margin, together with the basal on either side near the posterior angle, reflexed. The anterior angles are produced and acute, the apical margin is deeply sinuate on either side, its middle convex. The surface is smooth and shining, impunctate, convex, obliquely deflexed on the sides, the latter deeply excavated near their base. The elytra are ovate, broader than the thorax, their margin reflexed, its outer edge minutely serrated, serratures distant in front, gradually becoming closer towards the apex.

== Life history ==
No host plant has been documented for this species.
