= Homalispa variabilis =

Scientific classification
- Kingdom: Animalia
- Phylum: Arthropoda
- Clade: Pancrustacea
- Class: Insecta
- Order: Coleoptera
- Suborder: Polyphaga
- Infraorder: Cucujiformia
- Family: Chrysomelidae
- Genus: Homalispa
- Species: H. variabilis

Binomial name
- Homalispa variabilis Baly, 1885

Species of beetle

Homalispa variabilis is a species of beetle of the family Chrysomelidae. It is found in Panama.

== Description ==
The lower face is excavated and concave and the vertex is impressed with a few fine punctures. The antennae are more than half the length of the body, filiform and very slightly attenuated at the base and apex. The thorax is twice as broad as long at the base, the sides very oblique, quickly converging from the base to the apex, straight behind the middle, slightly rounded anteriorly, the apical angle produced, subacute, the basal one very acute. The basal margin is broadly concave, emarginate on either side, its medial portion very obtusely rounded and slightly reflexed. The upper surface is smooth and shining, remotely impressed with very fine punctures. The medial disc is covered with a broad black vitta, which extends from the base to the apex. The surface between this discoidal vitta and the lateral margin is excavated, the lateral margin itself reflexed. The elytra are rather broader than the base of the thorax, the sides straight, nearly parallel, the apical margin (conjointly) obtusely rounded. The outer border is very finely serrulate, with the serratures distant on the sides, but closer at the apex. Each elytron has eleven rows of distinct punctures, the first row short. The outer striae are subsulcate, their interspaces slightly convex.

== Biology ==
The food plant is unknown.
