= Xenispa pygidialis =

Scientific classification
- Kingdom: Animalia
- Phylum: Arthropoda
- Clade: Pancrustacea
- Class: Insecta
- Order: Coleoptera
- Suborder: Polyphaga
- Infraorder: Cucujiformia
- Family: Chrysomelidae
- Genus: Xenispa
- Species: X. pygidialis

Binomial name
- Xenispa pygidialis (Uhmann, 1940)

Synonyms
- Demotispa pygidialis Uhmann, 1940; Parimatidium pygidialis

Species of beetle

Xenispa pygidialis is a species of beetle of the family Chrysomelidae. It is found in Brazil (Rio Grande do Sul, São Paulo) and possibly Paraguay.

== Life history ==
The recorded host plants for this species are Bambusa species.
