= Xenispa germaini =

Scientific classification
- Kingdom: Animalia
- Phylum: Arthropoda
- Clade: Pancrustacea
- Class: Insecta
- Order: Coleoptera
- Suborder: Polyphaga
- Infraorder: Cucujiformia
- Family: Chrysomelidae
- Genus: Xenispa
- Species: X. germaini

Binomial name
- Xenispa germaini (Weise, 1905)

Synonyms
- Demotispa germaini Weise, 1905

Species of beetle

Xenispa germaini is a species of beetle of the family Chrysomelidae. It is found in Bolivia.

== Life history ==
No host plant has been documented for this species.
