= Xenispa collaris =

Scientific classification
- Kingdom: Animalia
- Phylum: Arthropoda
- Clade: Pancrustacea
- Class: Insecta
- Order: Coleoptera
- Suborder: Polyphaga
- Infraorder: Cucujiformia
- Family: Chrysomelidae
- Genus: Xenispa
- Species: X. collaris

Binomial name
- Xenispa collaris (Waterhouse, 1881)

Synonyms
- Homalispa collaris Waterhouse, 1881

Species of beetle

Xenispa collaris is a species of beetle of the family Chrysomelidae. It is found in Ecuador.

== Biology ==
The food plant is unknown.
