= Cyclantispa gracilis =

Scientific classification
- Kingdom: Animalia
- Phylum: Arthropoda
- Clade: Pancrustacea
- Class: Insecta
- Order: Coleoptera
- Suborder: Polyphaga
- Infraorder: Cucujiformia
- Family: Chrysomelidae
- Genus: Cyclantispa
- Species: C. gracilis

Binomial name
- Cyclantispa gracilis (Baly, 1885)

Synonyms
- Homalispa gracilis Baly, 1885

Species of beetle

Cyclantispa gracilis is a species of beetle of the family Chrysomelidae. It is found in Costa Rica and Panama.

== Description ==
The antennae are half the length of the body, filiform and attenuated at the base and the apex. The thorax is transversely convex, the sides nearly straight, scarcely converging from the base to beyond the middle, then rounded and converging to the apex. The anterior angle is produced and obtuse and the apical margin is truncate. The disc is smooth and shining, impunctate and impressed at the base with a few distinct punctures. The elytra are oblong and regularly punctate-striate.

== Biology ==
This species has been observed living in the closed youngest leaves of Cyclanthus bipartitus.
