= Xenispa cyanipennis =

Scientific classification
- Kingdom: Animalia
- Phylum: Arthropoda
- Clade: Pancrustacea
- Class: Insecta
- Order: Coleoptera
- Suborder: Polyphaga
- Infraorder: Cucujiformia
- Family: Chrysomelidae
- Genus: Xenispa
- Species: X. cyanipennis

Binomial name
- Xenispa cyanipennis (Boheman, 1850)

Synonyms
- Himatidium cyanipenne Boheman, 1850; Parimatidium cyanipenne

Species of beetle

Xenispa cyanipennis is a species of beetle of the family Chrysomelidae. It is found in Bolivia, Brazil and Peru.

== Life history ==
No host plant has been documented for this species.
