= Katkispa =

Scientific classification
- Kingdom: Animalia
- Phylum: Arthropoda
- Clade: Pancrustacea
- Class: Insecta
- Order: Coleoptera
- Suborder: Polyphaga
- Infraorder: Cucujiformia
- Family: Chrysomelidae
- Subfamily: Cassidinae
- Tribe: Imatidiini
- Genus: Katkispa; Sekerka, 2014
- Species: K. elongata

Binomial name
- Katkispa elongata (Pic, 1934)

Synonyms
- Euxema elongata Pic, 1934

Genus of beetles

Katkispa is a genus of leaf beetles in the family Chrysomelidae. It is monotypic, being represented by the single species, Katkispa elongata, which is found in Venezuela.

== Description ==
Adults reach a length of about 4 mm. They are reddish brown, while the pronotum is amber and the elytron is metallic blue-grey.

== Etymology ==
This genus is dedicated to the girlfriend of the author, Katka Štajerová and is derived from her first name and the generic name Hispa.
