= Cyclantispa subelongata =

Scientific classification
- Kingdom: Animalia
- Phylum: Arthropoda
- Clade: Pancrustacea
- Class: Insecta
- Order: Coleoptera
- Suborder: Polyphaga
- Infraorder: Cucujiformia
- Family: Chrysomelidae
- Genus: Cyclantispa
- Species: C. subelongata

Binomial name
- Cyclantispa subelongata (Pic, 1936)

Synonyms
- Homalispa subelongata Pic, 1936

Species of beetle

Cyclantispa subelongata is a species of beetle of the family Chrysomelidae. It is found in Bolivia.

== Biology ==
The food plant is unknown.
