= Xanthispa miniacea =

Scientific classification
- Kingdom: Animalia
- Phylum: Arthropoda
- Clade: Pancrustacea
- Class: Insecta
- Order: Coleoptera
- Suborder: Polyphaga
- Infraorder: Cucujiformia
- Family: Chrysomelidae
- Genus: Xanthispa
- Species: X. miniacea

Binomial name
- Xanthispa miniacea (Blanchard, 1843)

Synonyms
- Cephaloleia miniacea Blanchard, 1843; Homalispa miniacea

Species of beetle

Xanthispa miniacea is a species of beetle of the family Chrysomelidae. It is found in Bolivia.

== Biology ==
Adults have been recorded feeding on palms of the Attalea genus.
