= Stenispa sallei =

Scientific classification
- Kingdom: Animalia
- Phylum: Arthropoda
- Clade: Pancrustacea
- Class: Insecta
- Order: Coleoptera
- Suborder: Polyphaga
- Infraorder: Cucujiformia
- Family: Chrysomelidae
- Genus: Stenispa
- Species: S. sallei

Binomial name
- Stenispa sallei Baly, 1858

Species of beetle

Stenispa sallei is a species of beetle of the family Chrysomelidae. It is found in Mexico (Guerrero, Veracruz) and Nicaragua.

== Description ==
Adults are narrowly elongate, subcylindrical and bright cupreous. The surface is minutely granulose.

== Life history ==
No host plant has been documented for this species.
