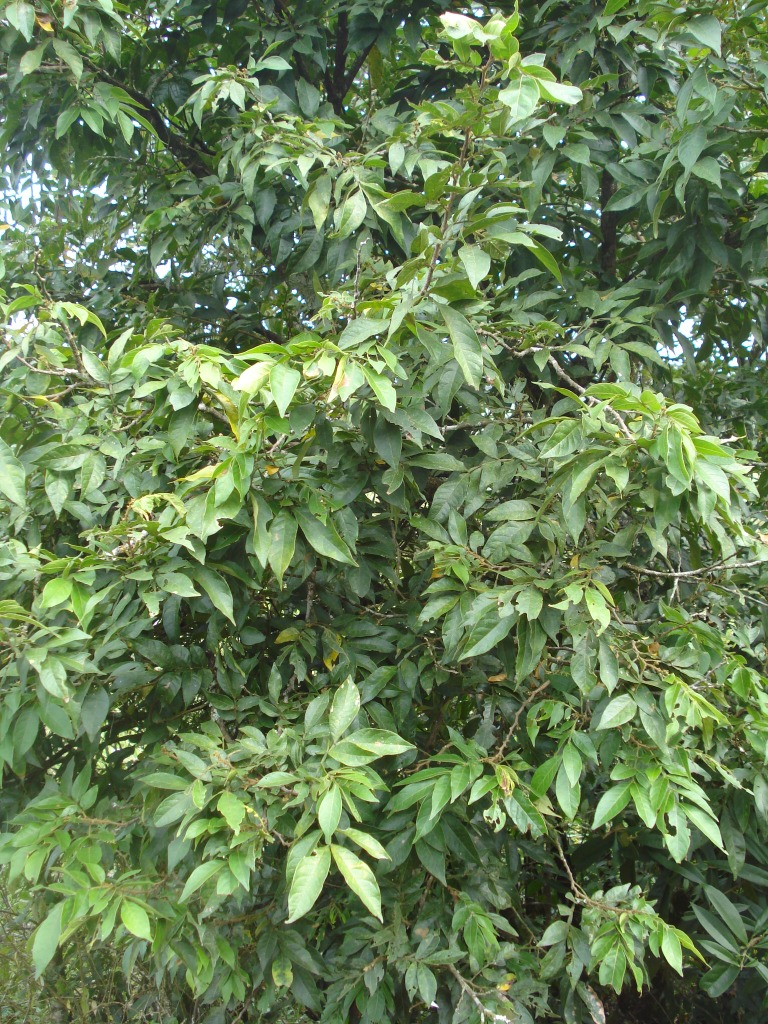

Scientific classification
- Kingdom: Plantae
- Clade: Tracheophytes
- Clade: Angiosperms
- Clade: Eudicots
- Clade: Rosids
- Order: Fabales
- Family: Fabaceae
- Subfamily: Caesalpinioideae
- Clade: Mimosoid clade
- Genus: Inga
- Species: I. marginata

Binomial name
- Inga marginata Willd.

= Inga marginata =

Species of legume

Inga marginata is a species of plant in the family Fabaceae.

It is native to Bolivia, Brazil, and Argentina. It is found in the Atlantic Forest ecoregion.
