= Parimatidium =

Scientific classification
- Kingdom: Animalia
- Phylum: Arthropoda
- Clade: Pancrustacea
- Class: Insecta
- Order: Coleoptera
- Suborder: Polyphaga
- Infraorder: Cucujiformia
- Family: Chrysomelidae
- Subfamily: Cassidinae
- Tribe: Imatidiini
- Genus: Parimatidium; Spaeth, 1938

Genus of leaf beetles

Parimatidium is a genus of beetles belonging to the family Chrysomelidae.

== Species ==
- Parimatidium marginicolle (Boheman, 1850)
- Parimatidium rubrum (Boheman, 1850)
