= Xenispa grayella =

Scientific classification
- Kingdom: Animalia
- Phylum: Arthropoda
- Clade: Pancrustacea
- Class: Insecta
- Order: Coleoptera
- Suborder: Polyphaga
- Infraorder: Cucujiformia
- Family: Chrysomelidae
- Genus: Xenispa
- Species: X. grayella

Binomial name
- Xenispa grayella (Baly, 1858)

Synonyms
- Homalispa grayella Baly, 1858

Species of beetle

Xenispa grayella is a species of beetle of the family Chrysomelidae. It is found in Brazil (Paraná, Rio de Janeiro, São Paulo).

== Description ==
Adults are broadly oblong-ovate and pale shining yellow. The antennae (except for the basal joint), eyes, pleurae, abdomen and elytra are black, the latter with an obscure blue tinge. The head is smooth. The thorax is transverse, twice as broad at the base as long, the sides with a broad reflexed margin, rounded, much narrowed in front, indistinctly so at the base. The anterior angles are produced, subacute, the posterior armed with a minute tooth. The apical margin is deeply excavated, sinuate on either side, its middle obsoletely produced, subconvex. The surface is smooth and shining, impunctate, impressed on either side of the central line and near the outer border with several indistinct foveae. At the base, near either angle, is a more deeply excavated transverse fovea. The elytra are subdepressed, scarcely broader than the base of the thorax, quadrate-ovate, their apex obtusely rounded. The outer margin is narrowly dilated, its edge slightly reflexed, distantly and obsoletely seriate along the sides, the serratures more distinct and crowded towards the apex.

== Life history ==
No host plant has been documented for this species.
