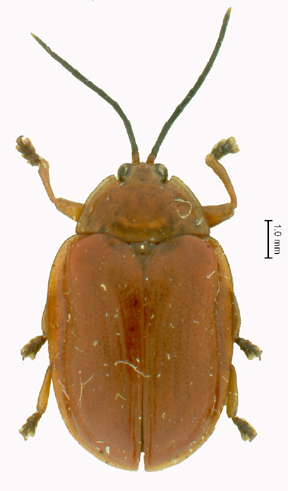

Scientific classification
- Kingdom: Animalia
- Phylum: Arthropoda
- Clade: Pancrustacea
- Class: Insecta
- Order: Coleoptera
- Suborder: Polyphaga
- Infraorder: Cucujiformia
- Family: Chrysomelidae
- Genus: Xanthispa
- Species: X. cimicoides

Binomial name
- Xanthispa cimicoides (Guérin-Méneville, 1844)

Synonyms
- Cephaloleia cimicoides Guérin-Méneville, 1844; Homalispa cimicoides

= Xanthispa cimicoides =

Species of beetle

Xanthispa cimicoides is a species of beetle of the family Chrysomelidae. It is found in French Guiana.

== Description ==
The thorax is narrowed from its base to the apex, with the side straight and margined and with the anterior angles obsolete. The elytra are pale testaceous, slightly convex, subdepressed above, sinuate below the shoulders, deeply punctate-striate. The side margin is slightly dilated, more especially in front, where its outer edge is indistinctly reflexed.

== Life history ==
No host plant has been documented for this species, but it is thought to be associated with Arecaceae species.
