= Lechispa parallela =

Scientific classification
- Kingdom: Animalia
- Phylum: Arthropoda
- Clade: Pancrustacea
- Class: Insecta
- Order: Coleoptera
- Suborder: Polyphaga
- Infraorder: Cucujiformia
- Family: Chrysomelidae
- Genus: Lechispa
- Species: L. parallela

Binomial name
- Lechispa parallela (Pic, 1930)

Synonyms
- Stenispa parallela Pic, 1930

Species of beetle

Lechispa parallela is a species of beetle of the family Chrysomelidae. It is found in Argentina (Buenos Aires, Chaco).

== Life history ==
The recorded host plant for this species is Paspalum quadrifarium.
