= Aslamidium semicirculare =

Scientific classification
- Kingdom: Animalia
- Phylum: Arthropoda
- Clade: Pancrustacea
- Class: Insecta
- Order: Coleoptera
- Suborder: Polyphaga
- Infraorder: Cucujiformia
- Family: Chrysomelidae
- Genus: Aslamidium
- Species: A. semicirculare

Binomial name
- Aslamidium semicirculare (Olivier, 1808)

Synonyms
- Cassida semicirculare Olivier, 1808; Imatidium cinctum Guérin-Méneville, 1844; Himatidium nisseri Boheman, 1862

Species of beetle

Aslamidium semicirculare is a species of beetle of the family Chrysomelidae. It is found in Colombia, Ecuador, French Guiana, Guyana, Panama, Peru and Venezuela.

== Biology ==
The recorded food plants are Zingiberales species, Heliconia latispatha, Calathea inocephala, Calathea insignis, Calathea latifolia, Calathea majestica, Calathea lutea and Ischnosiphon pruinosus.
