= Chelobasis bicolor =

Scientific classification
- Kingdom: Animalia
- Phylum: Arthropoda
- Clade: Pancrustacea
- Class: Insecta
- Order: Coleoptera
- Suborder: Polyphaga
- Infraorder: Cucujiformia
- Family: Chrysomelidae
- Genus: Chelobasis
- Species: C. bicolor

Binomial name
- Chelobasis bicolor Gray, 1832

Synonyms
- Chelobasis bicolor acutangula Weise, 1910

Species of beetle

Chelobasis bicolor is a species of beetle of the family Chrysomelidae. It is found in Bolivia, Colombia, Costa Rica, Ecuador, French Guiana, Guatemala, Mexico, Nicaragua and Panama.

== Biology ==
They have been recorded feeding on Musa and Heliconia species, including Heliconia latispatha, Heliconia tortuosa, Heliconia catheta, Heliconia imbricata, Heliconia irrasa, Heliconia mariae, Heliconia pogonantha, Heliconia wagneriana, Heliconia stricta and Heliconia uxpanapensis, as well as Calathea latifolia.
