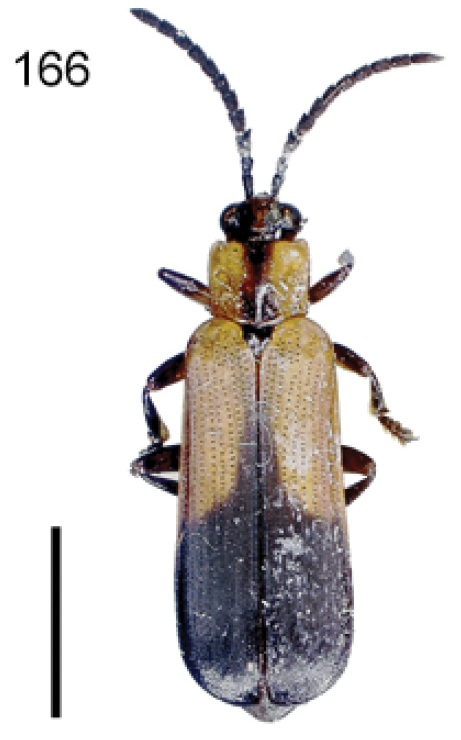

Scientific classification
- Kingdom: Animalia
- Phylum: Arthropoda
- Class: Insecta
- Order: Coleoptera
- Suborder: Polyphaga
- Infraorder: Cucujiformia
- Family: Chrysomelidae
- Genus: Cephaloleia
- Species: C. instabilis

Binomial name
- Cephaloleia instabilis Baly, 1885

Synonyms
- Cephaloleia intermedia Baly, 1885; Cephaloleia instabilis gilvipennis Weise, 1905; Cephaloleia instabilis obscura Weise, 1905; Cephaloleia insignis Meskins et al., 2008

= Cephaloleia instabilis =

Species of beetle

Cephaloleia instabilis is a species of beetle in the family Chrysomelidae. It is found in Costa Rica, Guatemala, Mexico and Panama.

== Description ==
Adults reach a length of about 6.88–8.32 mm. The head, antennae and scutellum are black and the pronotum is reddish-brown with variable black markings. The elytron varies from totally reddish-brown, to variable black markings to totally black.

== Biology ==
Recorded host plants are Heliconia latispatha, Heliconia difficilis, Heliconia imbricata, Heliconia wagneriana, Calathea latifolia, Heliconia catheta, Heliconia mariae, Heliconia rostrata, Musa velutina, Calathea crotalifera and Heliconia wilsonii.
