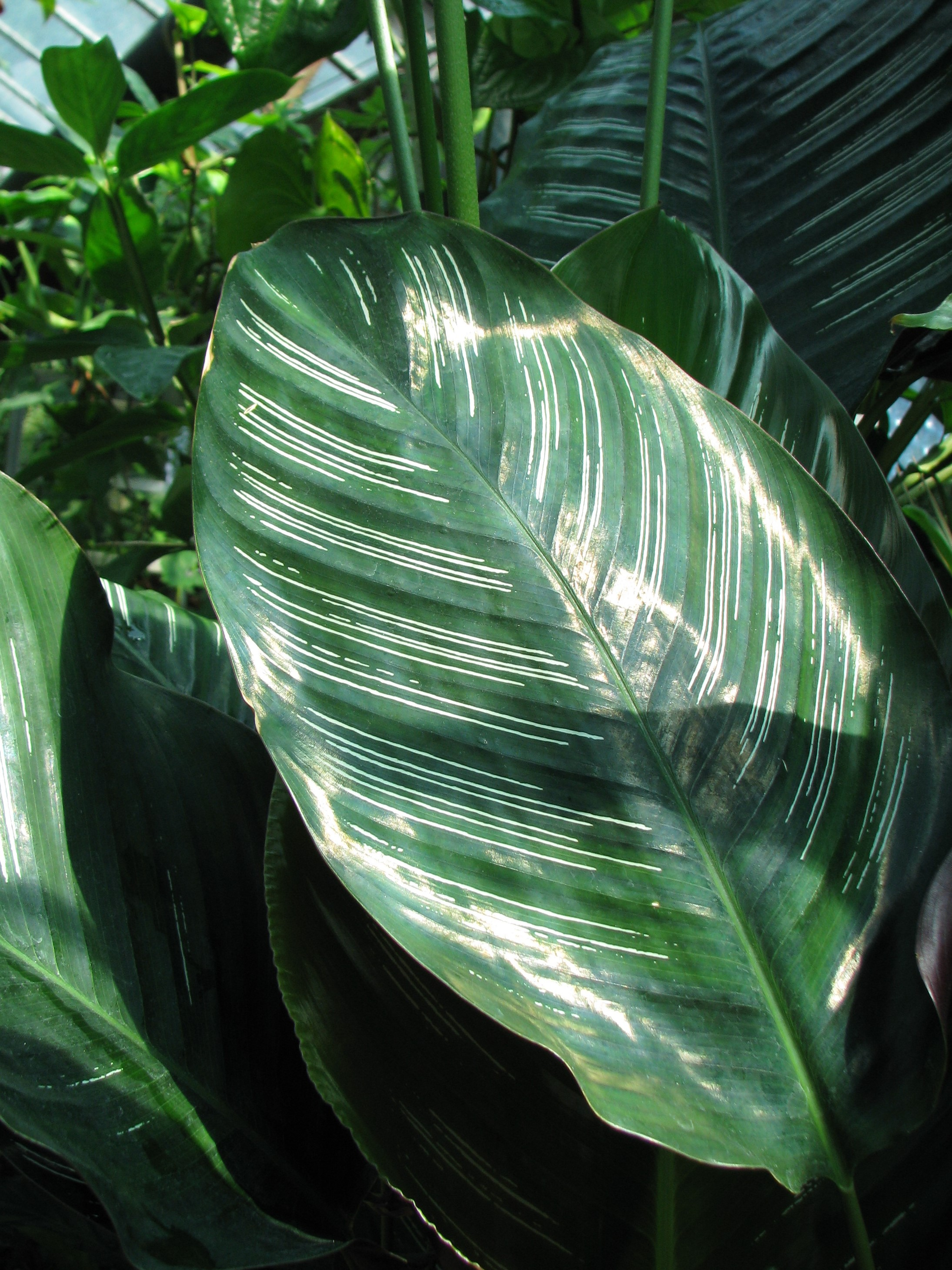

Scientific classification
- Kingdom: Plantae
- Clade: Tracheophytes
- Clade: Angiosperms
- Clade: Monocots
- Clade: Commelinids
- Order: Zingiberales
- Family: Marantaceae
- Genus: Goeppertia
- Species: G. sanderiana

Binomial name
- Goeppertia sanderiana (Sander) Borchs. & S.Suárez

= Goeppertia sanderiana =

Species of flowering plant

Goeppertia sanderiana is a species of plant belonging to the genus Goeppertia in the family Marantaceae. It is native to Peru and has been introduced to El Salvador and Honduras. It is a very common ornemental plant used in homes because of its beautiful foliage. It belongs to one of the groups in the Goeppertia genus called the Ornata clade.

== Description ==
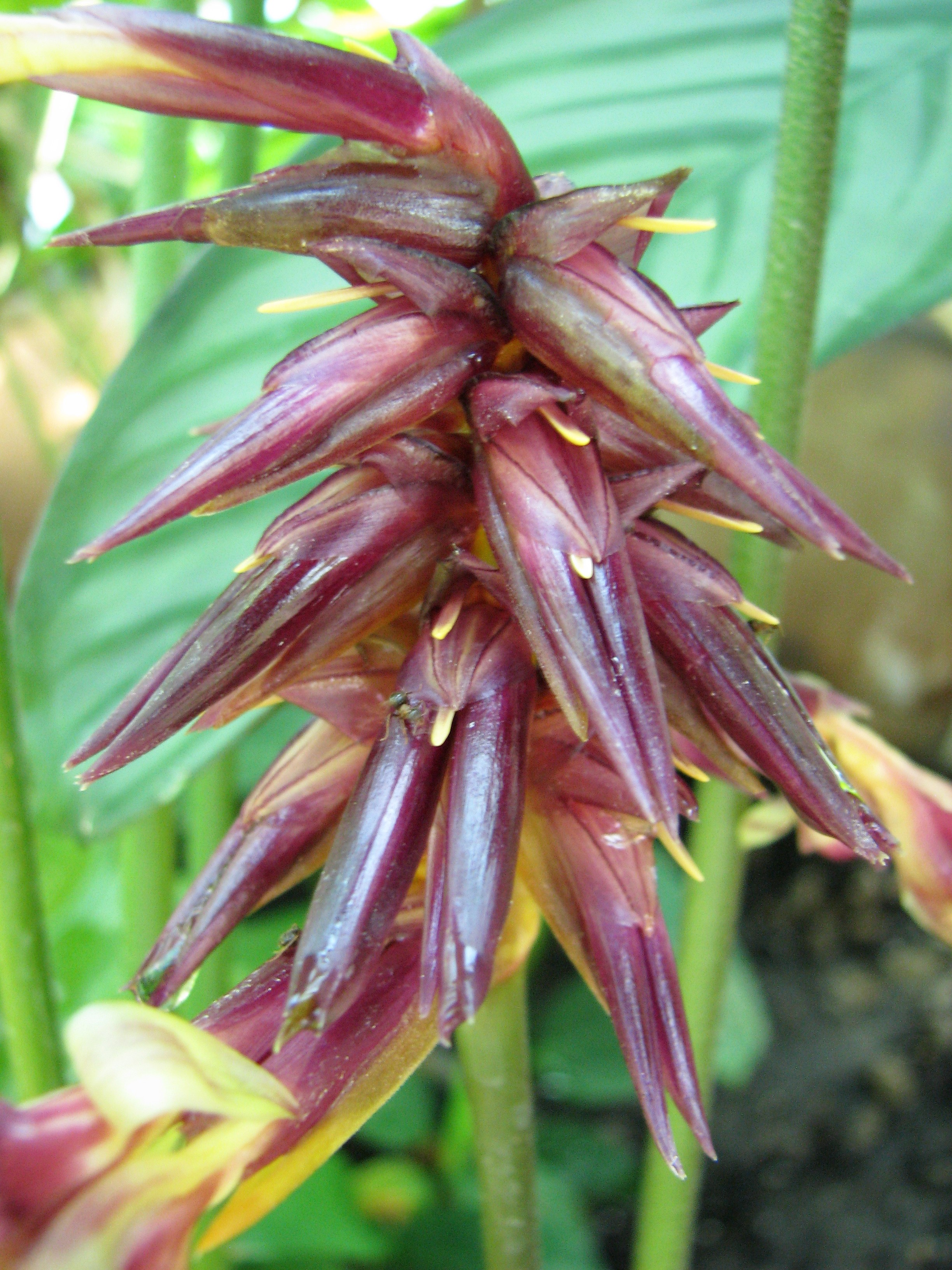
Inflorescence of Goeppertia sanderiana

Goeppertia sanderiana has dark green leaves with a pink, white striped pattern on the upper side of the leaf. This pattern disappears as the plant matures and is all green when mature. The bottom side of the leaf is purple throughout the plant's life. The inflorescence of Goeppertia sanderiana is similar to Goeppertia elliptica, Goeppertia bantae or Calathea monstera.

== A confusion... ==
Goeppertia sanderiana is often sold as Pin-stripe Calathea or Calathea ornata. While this species do exist, the plant that is sold around the world is Goeppertia sanderiana (or Goeppertia majestica). The real Goeppertia ornata is a very rare striped pattern species of Goeppertia native to Venezuela and Colombia and disappeared from cultivation some time prior to the mid-1990s.
