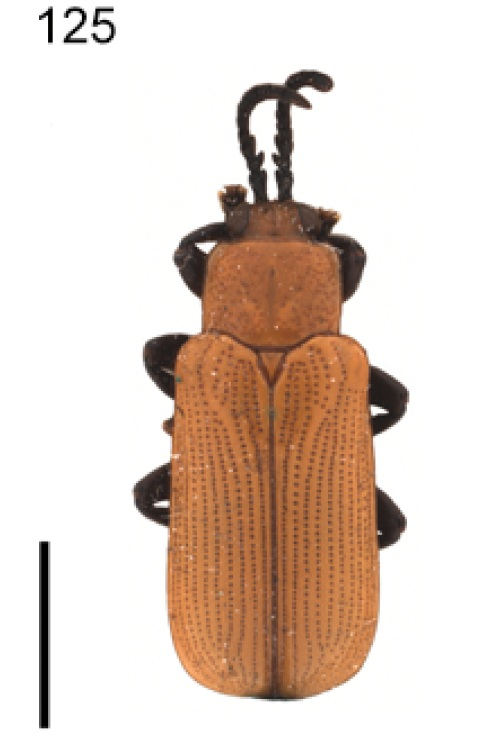

Scientific classification
- Kingdom: Animalia
- Phylum: Arthropoda
- Class: Insecta
- Order: Coleoptera
- Suborder: Polyphaga
- Infraorder: Cucujiformia
- Family: Chrysomelidae
- Genus: Cephaloleia
- Species: C. distincta

Binomial name
- Cephaloleia distincta Baly, 1885

Synonyms
- Cephalolia nigripes Pic 1926

= Cephaloleia distincta =

Species of beetle

Cephaloleia distincta is a species of beetle of the family Chrysomelidae. It is found in Colombia, Costa Rica and Panama.

== Description ==
Adults reach a length of about 7.6–9.6 mm. Adults are reddish-brown, with the antennae, eyes and parts of the legs darker. The elytron sometimes has a narrow black sutural vitta.

== Biology ==
Adults have been collected on Calathea species, while adults and larvae have been collected on Heliconia imbricata, Heliconia mariae, Alpinia purpurata, Heliconia latispatha, Heliconia rostrata, Heliconia stricta, Heliconia wagneriana, Musa paradisiaca, Cephaloleia crotalifera and Pleiostachya leiostachya.
