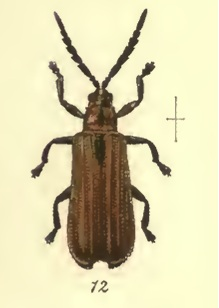

Scientific classification
- Kingdom: Animalia
- Phylum: Arthropoda
- Class: Insecta
- Order: Coleoptera
- Suborder: Polyphaga
- Infraorder: Cucujiformia
- Family: Chrysomelidae
- Genus: Platocthispa
- Species: P. emorsitans

Binomial name
- Platocthispa emorsitans (Baly, 1885)

Synonyms
- Uroplata emorsitans Baly, 1885

= Platocthispa emorsitans =

Species of beetle

Platocthispa emorsitans is a species of beetle of the family Chrysomelidae. It is found in Costa Rica, Nicaragua and Panama.

== Description ==
The elytra are subparallel, very slightly increasing in width from the base towards the apex, the latter rounded, broadly emarginate at the sutural angle. The outer margin is finely serrulate. Each elytron has eight regular rows of punctures. The second, fourth, and sixth interspaces are costate, with the outer costa less strongly elevated than the others.

== Biology ==
The recorded food plants are Calathea (including Calathea insignis and Calathea latifolia), as well as Costus species, Heliconia catheta, Heliconia irrasa and Heliconia latispatha.
