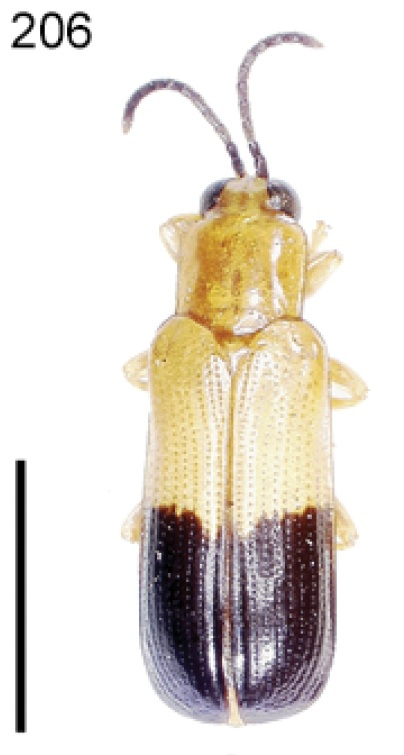

Scientific classification
- Kingdom: Animalia
- Phylum: Arthropoda
- Class: Insecta
- Order: Coleoptera
- Suborder: Polyphaga
- Infraorder: Cucujiformia
- Family: Chrysomelidae
- Genus: Cephaloleia
- Species: C. partita

Binomial name
- Cephaloleia partita Weise, 1910

= Cephaloleia partita =

Species of beetle

Cephaloleia partita is a species of beetle of the family Chrysomelidae. It is found in Bolivia, Colombia, Panama, Peru and Venezuela.

== Description ==
Adults reach a length of about 5.9–6 mm. Adults are yellowish with the eyes, antennae and apical half of the elytron black.

== Biology ==
Adults have been collected on Heliconia species (including Heliconia lathispatha and Heliconia catheta), as well as on Calathea latifolia.
