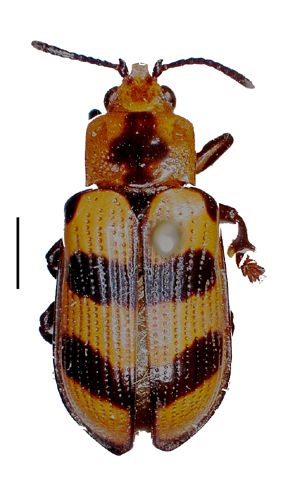

Scientific classification
- Kingdom: Animalia
- Phylum: Arthropoda
- Clade: Pancrustacea
- Class: Insecta
- Order: Coleoptera
- Suborder: Polyphaga
- Infraorder: Cucujiformia
- Family: Chrysomelidae
- Genus: Chelobasis
- Species: C. perplexa

Binomial name
- Chelobasis perplexa (Baly, 1858)

Synonyms
- Arescus perplexus Baly, 1858

= Chelobasis perplexa =

Species of beetle

Chelobasis perplexa is a species of beetle of the family Chrysomelidae. It is found in Brazil, Colombia, Costa Rica, Ecuador, Guatemala, Nicaragua and Panama.

== Description ==
Adults are variable in colour. It may be at once separated from its allies by the angular apices and deep punctuation of the elytra.

== Biology ==
They have been recorded feeding on Heliconia imbricata, Heliconia latispatha, Heliconia pogonantha, Heliconia irrasa, Heliconia irrasa, Heliconia mariae, Heliconia mathiasiae, Calathea insignis and Calathea lutea.
