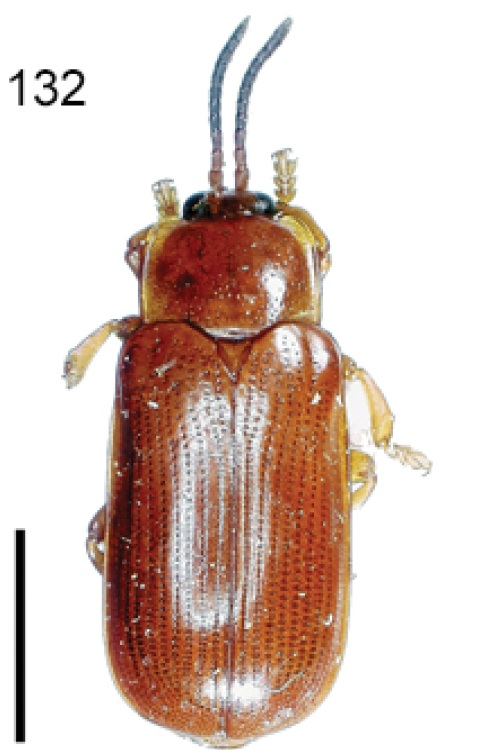

Scientific classification
- Kingdom: Animalia
- Phylum: Arthropoda
- Class: Insecta
- Order: Coleoptera
- Suborder: Polyphaga
- Infraorder: Cucujiformia
- Family: Chrysomelidae
- Genus: Cephaloleia
- Species: C. erichsonii

Binomial name
- Cephaloleia erichsonii Baly, 1858

= Cephaloleia erichsonii =

Species of beetle

Cephaloleia erichsonii is a species of beetle of the family Chrysomelidae. It is found in Brazil, Colombia, Costa Rica, Panama and Peru.

== Description ==
Adults reach a length of about 6.7–8 mm. Adults are reddish-brown, with dark eyes. Antennomeres 1 or 1–2 are yellow and 3–11 are darker.

== Biology ==
Adults have been collected on Calathea gymnocarpa, Cephaloleia inocephala, Cephaloleia leucostachys, Heliconia species, Cephaloleia insignis, Cephaloleia latifolia, Cephaloleia lutea, Heliconia catheta, Heliconia latispatha, Heliconia mariae, Heliconia vaginalis, Heliconia wagneriana, Cephaloleia cleistantha, Cephaloleia crotalifera, Cephaloleia lutea, Cephaloleia marantifolia and Heliconia stricta.
