= Aslamidium ecuadoricum =

Scientific classification
- Kingdom: Animalia
- Phylum: Arthropoda
- Clade: Pancrustacea
- Class: Insecta
- Order: Coleoptera
- Suborder: Polyphaga
- Infraorder: Cucujiformia
- Family: Chrysomelidae
- Genus: Aslamidium
- Species: A. ecuadoricum

Binomial name
- Aslamidium ecuadoricum Borowiec, 1998

Synonyms
- Aslamidium ecuadorense

Species of beetle

Aslamidium ecuadoricum is a species of beetle of the family Chrysomelidae. It is found in Ecuador.

== Description ==
Adults reach a length of about 6.8–7.7 mm. They have a pale yellow pronotum, with two black spots at the base. The elytron is also pale yellow and has a number of black spots and bands. This species is superficially similar to Aslamidium capense.

== Etymology ==
The species is named after the type locality.
