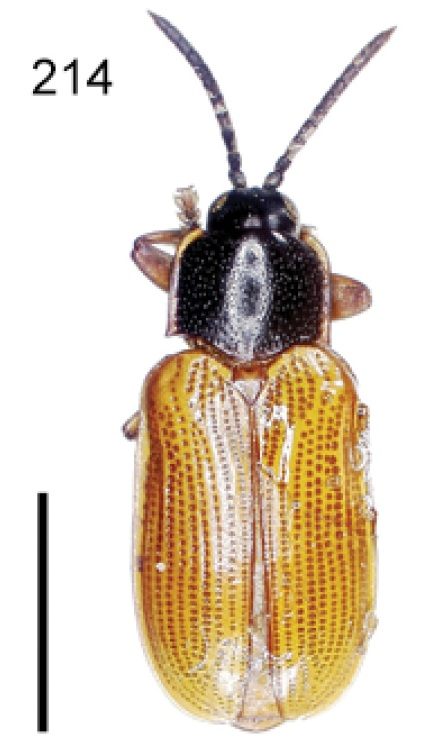

Scientific classification
- Kingdom: Animalia
- Phylum: Arthropoda
- Class: Insecta
- Order: Coleoptera
- Suborder: Polyphaga
- Infraorder: Cucujiformia
- Family: Chrysomelidae
- Genus: Cephaloleia
- Species: C. pretiosa

Binomial name
- Cephaloleia pretiosa Baly, 1858

= Cephaloleia pretiosa =

Species of beetle

Cephaloleia pretiosa is a species of beetle of the family Chrysomelidae. It is found in Bolivia, Brazil, Colombia, Costa Rica, Panama, Ecuador, Peru and Venezuela.

== Description ==
Adults reach a length of about 5–6.8 mm. The head and pronotum are black, while the pronotal margin, scutellum, legs and elytron are reddish-brown.

== Biology ==
Adults have been collected on Heliconia species (including Heliconia catheta, Heliconia latispatha, Heliconia mariae and Heliconia wagneriana) and Calathea pulverulentus.
