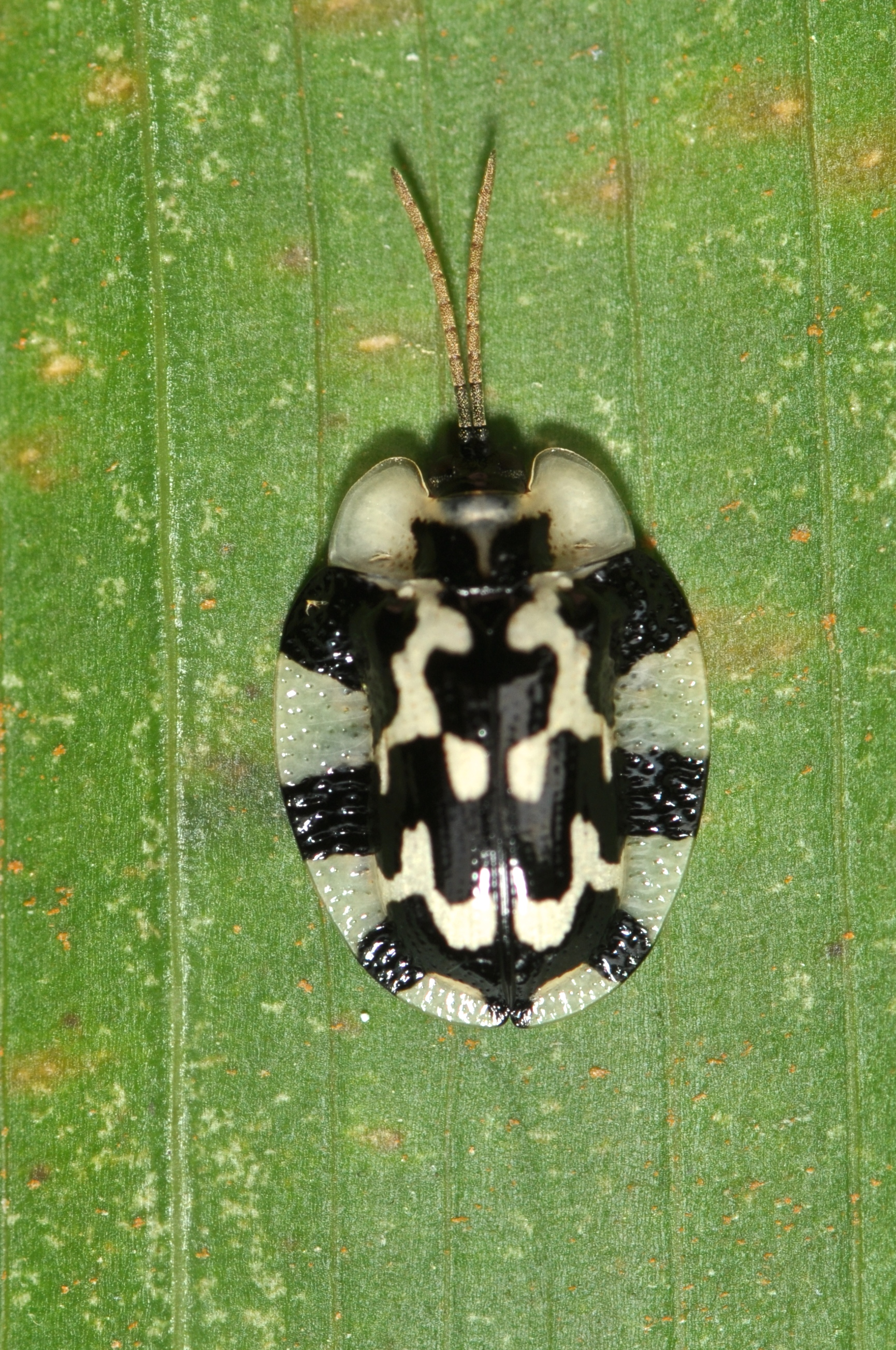
- An unidentified Aslamidium species

Scientific classification
- Kingdom: Animalia
- Phylum: Arthropoda
- Clade: Pancrustacea
- Class: Insecta
- Order: Coleoptera
- Suborder: Polyphaga
- Infraorder: Cucujiformia
- Family: Chrysomelidae
- Subfamily: Cassidinae
- Tribe: Imatidiini
- Genus: Aslamidium; Borowiec, 1984

= Aslamidium =

Genus of leaf beetles

Aslamidium is a genus of beetles belonging to the family Chrysomelidae.

== Species ==
- Subgenus Aslamidium
  - Aslamidium bolivianum Borowiec & Sassi, 2001
  - Aslamidium capense (Herbst, 1799)
  - Aslamidium coca Borowiec, 1998
  - Aslamidium ecuadoricum Borowiec, 1998
  - Aslamidium impurum (Boheman, 1850)
  - Aslamidium quatuordecimmaculatum (Latreille, 1811)
  - Aslamidium semicirculare (Olivier, 1808)
- Subgenus Neoaslamidium Borowiec, 1998
  - Aslamidium flavomaculata Staines, 2006
  - Aslamidium formosum (Spaeth, 1907)
  - Aslamidium lepidium Staines, 2006
  - Aslamidium lescheni Borowiec, 1998
  - Aslamidium pinchinchanesis Borowiec, 1998
  - Aslamidium strandi (Uhmann, 1930)

== Former species ==
- Aslamidium apertura Staines, 2013
