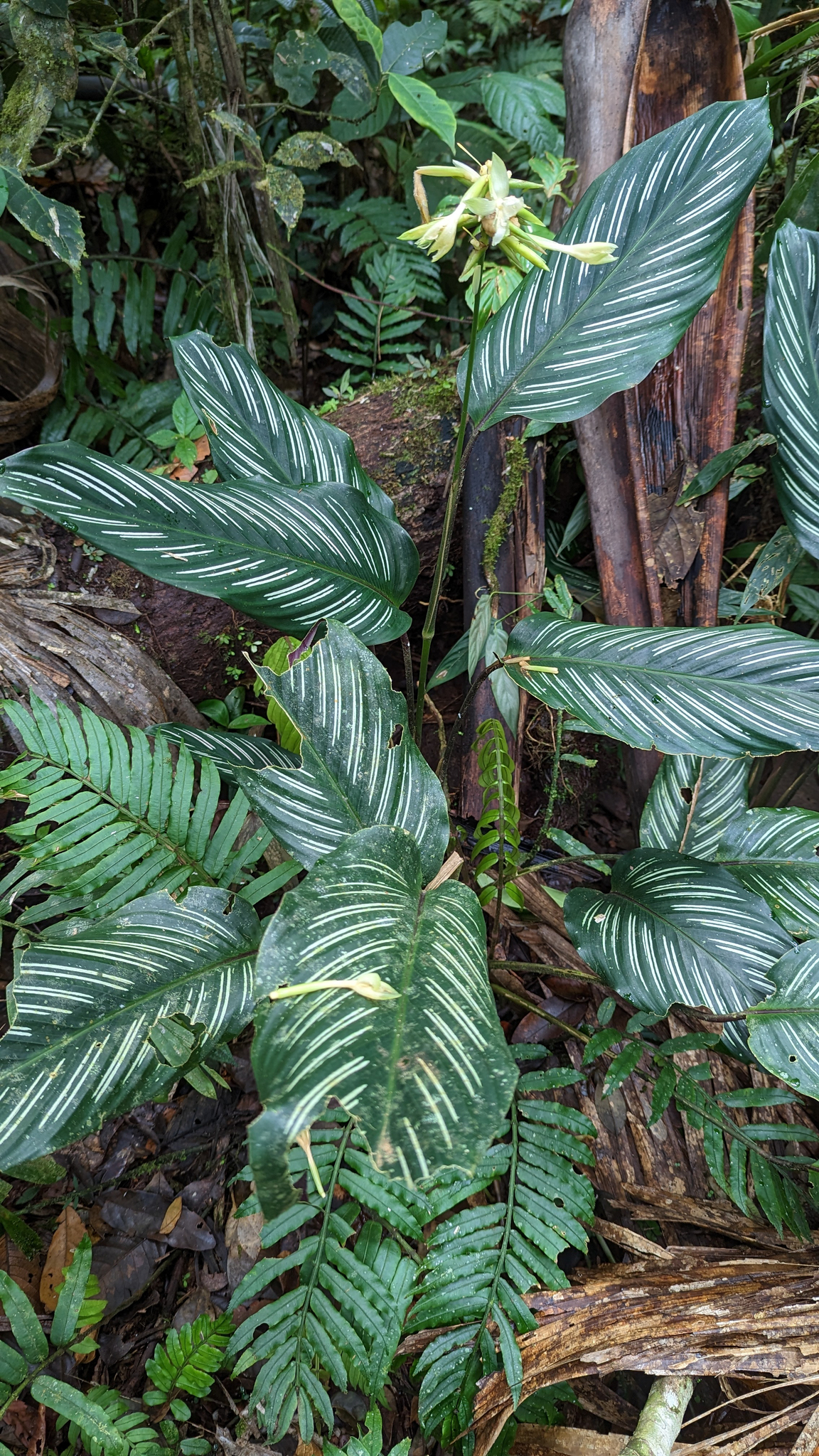

Scientific classification
- Kingdom: Plantae
- Clade: Tracheophytes
- Clade: Angiosperms
- Clade: Monocots
- Clade: Commelinids
- Order: Zingiberales
- Family: Marantaceae
- Genus: Goeppertia
- Species: G. bantae

Binomial name
- Goeppertia bantae (H.Kenn.) Borchs. & S.Suárez

Synonyms
- Calathea bantae H.Kenn.

= Goeppertia bantae =

Species of flowering plant

Goeppertia bantae is a species of plant from the Goeppertia genus, in the Marantaceae family which is native to Colombia and Ecuador. It was discover by Helen Kennedy as Calathea bantae in 1986 in the Canadian Journal of Botany (vol.64). This species belongs to the sub-group of Goeppertia called the Ornata clade.

== Description ==
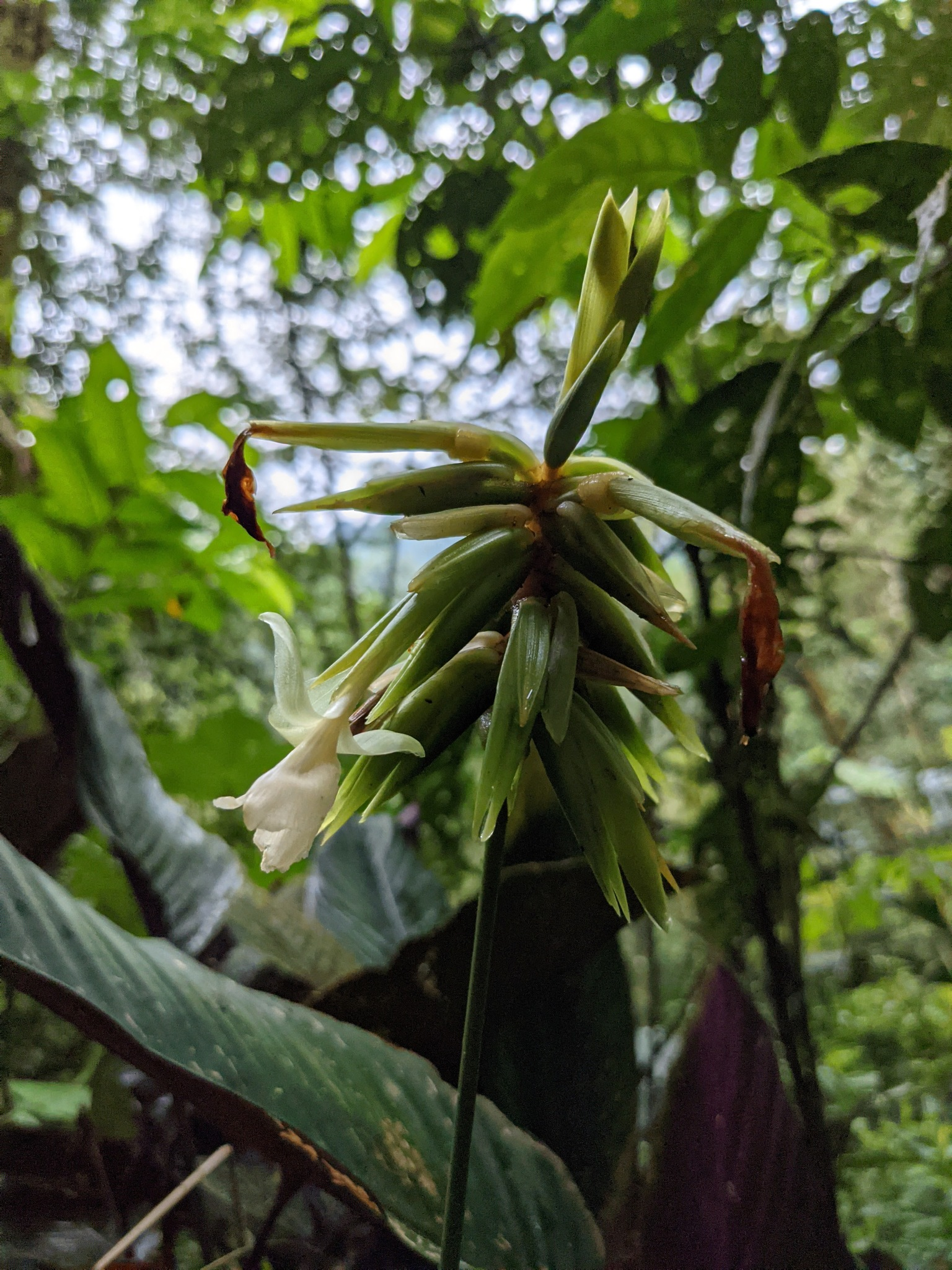
Inflorescence of Goeppertia bantae

Goeppertia bantae is a small plant from the tropical rainforests. It has long dark green leaves with purple undersides, long petioles, and a short pulvinus. Juvenile plants usually have pink or white lines above the leaves, which makes it appart of the Ornata group of Goeppertia and Calathea. With maturity, they often lose their pattern and become plain green, but it is not always the case. A second variety of this plant exists with a brush pattern, which consists of two broad, longitudinal, yellowish-green bands on each side of the leaf. The inflorescence of G. bantae is made of multiple spike shaped bracts spirally arranged around a thin, green peduncle. The bracts are green and the flowers are white and green. Its inflorescence is similar to G. elliptica, G. sanderiana and C. monstera.
