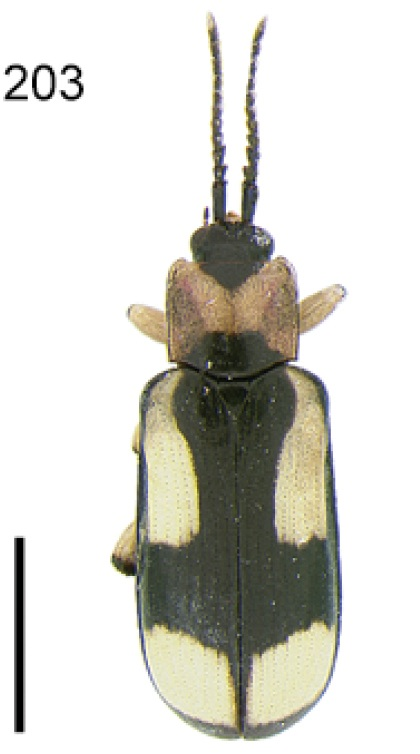

Scientific classification
- Kingdom: Animalia
- Phylum: Arthropoda
- Class: Insecta
- Order: Coleoptera
- Suborder: Polyphaga
- Infraorder: Cucujiformia
- Family: Chrysomelidae
- Genus: Cephaloleia
- Species: C. ornatrix

Binomial name
- Cephaloleia ornatrix Donckier, 1899

= Cephaloleia ornatrix =

Species of beetle

Cephaloleia ornatrix is a species of beetle of the family Chrysomelidae. It is found in Costa Rica, Nicaragua and Panama.

== Description ==
Adults reach a length of about 7.4–8.3 mm. The head, antennae and scutellum are black and the pronotum and elytron are reddish-brown with variable black markings.

== Biology ==
Adults have been collected feeding on Heliconia species (including Heliconia mariae and Heliconia pogonantha).
