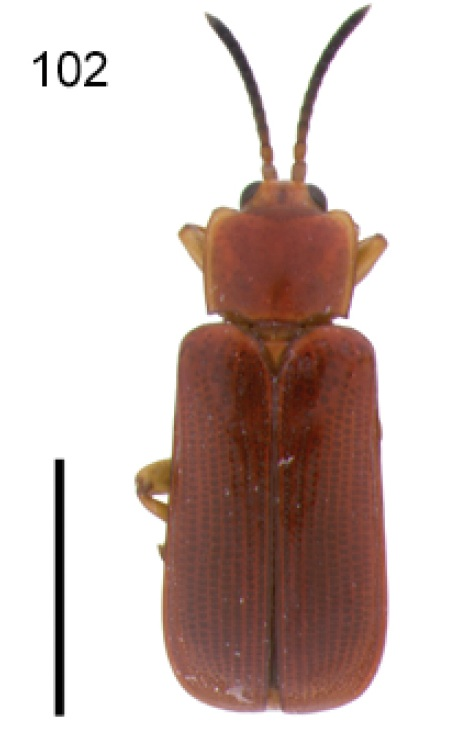

Scientific classification
- Kingdom: Animalia
- Phylum: Arthropoda
- Class: Insecta
- Order: Coleoptera
- Suborder: Polyphaga
- Infraorder: Cucujiformia
- Family: Chrysomelidae
- Genus: Cephaloleia
- Species: C. conforma

Binomial name
- Cephaloleia conforma García-Robledo & Staines, 2014

= Cephaloleia conforma =

Species of beetle

Cephaloleia conforma is a species of beetle of the family Chrysomelidae. It is found in Costa Rica.

== Description ==
Adults reach a length of about 6.2–6.6 mm. Adults are reddish-brown, with the antennae (except the basal 2 antennomeres) and eyes black. The venter and legs are paler.

== Biology ==
Adults have been collected off Calathea species and Cephaloleia guzamanioides.

== Etymology ==
The species name is derived from Latin conformis (meaning like or resembling), since the species resembles Cephaloleia congener and Cephaloleia sallei.
