= Nympharescus =

Scientific classification
- Kingdom: Animalia
- Phylum: Arthropoda
- Clade: Pancrustacea
- Class: Insecta
- Order: Coleoptera
- Suborder: Polyphaga
- Infraorder: Cucujiformia
- Family: Chrysomelidae
- Subfamily: Cassidinae
- Tribe: Arescini
- Genus: Nympharescus; Weise, 1905

Genus of leaf beetles

Nympharescus is a genus of beetles belonging to the family Chrysomelidae.

== Species ==
- Nympharescus aemulus (Waterhouse, 1881)
- Nympharescus albidipennis Weise, 1910
- Nympharescus emarginatus Weise, 1910
- Nympharescus gibber Uhmann, 1968
- Nympharescus laevicollis (Waterhouse, 1879)
- Nympharescus ocelletus Weise, 1910
- Nympharescus proteus Weise, 1913
- Nympharescus separatus (Baly, 1858)
- Nympharescus turbatus Weise, 1913
