= Aslamidium coca =

Scientific classification
- Kingdom: Animalia
- Phylum: Arthropoda
- Clade: Pancrustacea
- Class: Insecta
- Order: Coleoptera
- Suborder: Polyphaga
- Infraorder: Cucujiformia
- Family: Chrysomelidae
- Genus: Aslamidium
- Species: A. coca

Binomial name
- Aslamidium coca Borowiec, 1998

Species of beetle

Aslamidium coca is a species of beetle of the family Chrysomelidae. It is found in Ecuador.

== Description ==
Adults reach a length of about 6.8 mm. They have a pale yellow pronotum. The elytron is also pale yellow, but with a black pattern consisting of small dots, a Y-shaped spot, a triangular spot and a transverse spot.

== Etymology ==
The species is named after both the coca shrub and Coca village in Napo District (Ecuador).
