= Aslamidium formosum =

Scientific classification
- Kingdom: Animalia
- Phylum: Arthropoda
- Clade: Pancrustacea
- Class: Insecta
- Order: Coleoptera
- Suborder: Polyphaga
- Infraorder: Cucujiformia
- Family: Chrysomelidae
- Genus: Aslamidium
- Species: A. formosum

Binomial name
- Aslamidium formosum (Spaeth, 1907)

Synonyms
- Himatidium formosum Spaeth, 1907

Species of beetle

Aslamidium formosum is a species of beetle of the family Chrysomelidae. It is found in Peru.

== Biology ==
The food plant is unknown.
