= Aslamidium lescheni =

Scientific classification
- Kingdom: Animalia
- Phylum: Arthropoda
- Clade: Pancrustacea
- Class: Insecta
- Order: Coleoptera
- Suborder: Polyphaga
- Infraorder: Cucujiformia
- Family: Chrysomelidae
- Genus: Aslamidium
- Species: A. lescheni

Binomial name
- Aslamidium lescheni Borowiec, 1998

Species of beetle

Aslamidium lescheni is a species of beetle of the family Chrysomelidae. It is found in Peru.

== Description ==
Adults reach a length of about 4.5-5.2 mm. They have a pale yellow pronotum with a small black spot. The elytron is also pale yellow, but with a black pattern.

== Etymology ==
The species is named for R. Leschen, who collected this species in Peru.
