= Arescus =

Scientific classification
- Kingdom: Animalia
- Phylum: Arthropoda
- Clade: Pancrustacea
- Class: Insecta
- Order: Coleoptera
- Suborder: Polyphaga
- Infraorder: Cucujiformia
- Family: Chrysomelidae
- Subfamily: Cassidinae
- Tribe: Arescini
- Genus: Arescus; Perty, 1832

Genus of leaf beetles

Arescus is a genus of beetles belonging to the family Chrysomelidae.

== Species ==
- Arescus histrio Baly, 1858
- Arescus hypocrita Weise, 1910
- Arescus labiatus Perty, 1832
- Arescus laticollis Weise, 1910
- Arescus parumpunctatus Gorham, 1891
- Arescus vicinus Uhmann, 1926 (type location unknown)
- Arescus zonatus Weise, 1913
