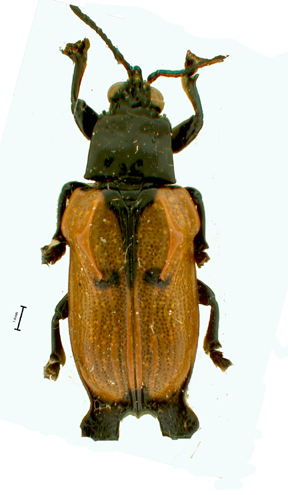

Scientific classification
- Kingdom: Animalia
- Phylum: Arthropoda
- Clade: Pancrustacea
- Class: Insecta
- Order: Coleoptera
- Suborder: Polyphaga
- Infraorder: Cucujiformia
- Family: Chrysomelidae
- Subfamily: Cassidinae
- Tribe: Arescini
- Genus: Xenarescus; Weise, 1905
- Species: X. monoceros

Binomial name
- Xenarescus monoceros (Olivier, 1808)

Synonyms
- Hispa monoceros Olivier, 1808; Arescus quadrimaculatus Sallé, 1849

= Xenarescus =

Genus of beetles

Xenarescus is a genus of leaf beetles in the family Chrysomelidae. It is monotypic, being represented by the single species, Xenarescus monoceros, which is found in Brazil, Colombia, Tobago, Trinidad and Venezuela.

== Biology ==
They have been recorded feeding on Guanasna species, Heliconia bahai, Heliconia aurea, Heliconia revoluta, Heliconia caribaea, Heliconia rodriguensis and Stromanthe species.
