= Nympharescus laevicollis =

Scientific classification
- Kingdom: Animalia
- Phylum: Arthropoda
- Clade: Pancrustacea
- Class: Insecta
- Order: Coleoptera
- Suborder: Polyphaga
- Infraorder: Cucujiformia
- Family: Chrysomelidae
- Genus: Nympharescus
- Species: N. laevicollis

Binomial name
- Nympharescus laevicollis (Waterhouse, 1879)

Synonyms
- Arescus laevicollis Waterhouse, 1879; Chelobasis laevicollis; Arescus waterhousei Duvivier, 1885

Species of beetle

Nympharescus laevicollis is a species of beetle of the family Chrysomelidae. It is found in Colombia.
