= Aslamidium bolivianum =

Scientific classification
- Kingdom: Animalia
- Phylum: Arthropoda
- Clade: Pancrustacea
- Class: Insecta
- Order: Coleoptera
- Suborder: Polyphaga
- Infraorder: Cucujiformia
- Family: Chrysomelidae
- Genus: Aslamidium
- Species: A. bolivianum

Binomial name
- Aslamidium bolivianum Borowiec & Sassi, 2001

Species of beetle

Aslamidium bolivianum is a species of beetle of the family Chrysomelidae. It is found in Bolivia.

== Description ==
Adults reach a length of about 6–7 mm. Both the pronotum and elytron are yellow, the former without markings, the latter with several black spots and bands.

== Etymology ==
The species is named after the country where it was first discovered.
