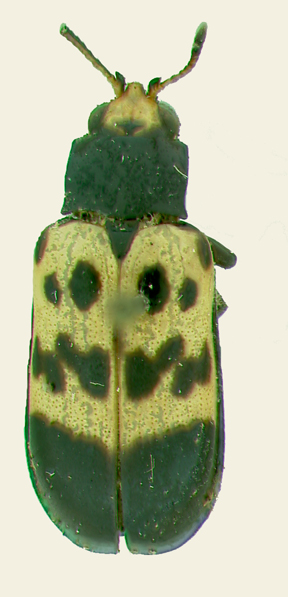

Scientific classification
- Kingdom: Animalia
- Phylum: Arthropoda
- Clade: Pancrustacea
- Class: Insecta
- Order: Coleoptera
- Suborder: Polyphaga
- Infraorder: Cucujiformia
- Family: Chrysomelidae
- Genus: Nympharescus
- Species: N. separatus

Binomial name
- Nympharescus separatus (Baly, 1858)

Synonyms
- Arescus separatus Baly, 1858; Arescus perplexus Waterhouse, 1881 (preocc.); Arescus dubius Donckier, 1899; Arescus pulcher Waterhouse, 1881

= Nympharescus separatus =

Species of beetle

Nympharescus separatus is a species of beetle of the family Chrysomelidae. It is found in Ecuador and Peru.

== Biology ==
They have been recorded feeding on Heliconia pogonantha.
