= Arescus histrio =

Scientific classification
- Kingdom: Animalia
- Phylum: Arthropoda
- Clade: Pancrustacea
- Class: Insecta
- Order: Coleoptera
- Suborder: Polyphaga
- Infraorder: Cucujiformia
- Family: Chrysomelidae
- Genus: Arescus
- Species: A. histrio

Binomial name
- Arescus histrio Baly, 1858

Synonyms
- Arescus histrio apicalis Pic, 1927; Arescus histrio atricollis Pic, 1927; Arescus histrio donckieri Pic, 1927; Arescus histrio flavescens Pic, 1927; Arescus histrio humeralis Pic, 1927; Arescus histrio inhumeralis Pic, 1927; Arescus histrio inlimbata Pic, 1927; Arescus histrio notata Pic, 1927; Arescus histrio notaticollis Pic, 1927; Arescus histrio reducta Pic, 1927; Arescus histrio rubricolor Pic, 1927; Arescus histrio sublimbata Pic, 1927; Arescus histrio testaceicollis Pic, 1927; Arescus histrio pesudohumeralis Descarpentries & Villiers, 1959

Species of beetle

Arescus histrio is a species of beetle of the family Chrysomelidae. It is found in Bolivia, Brazil, Ecuador and Peru.
