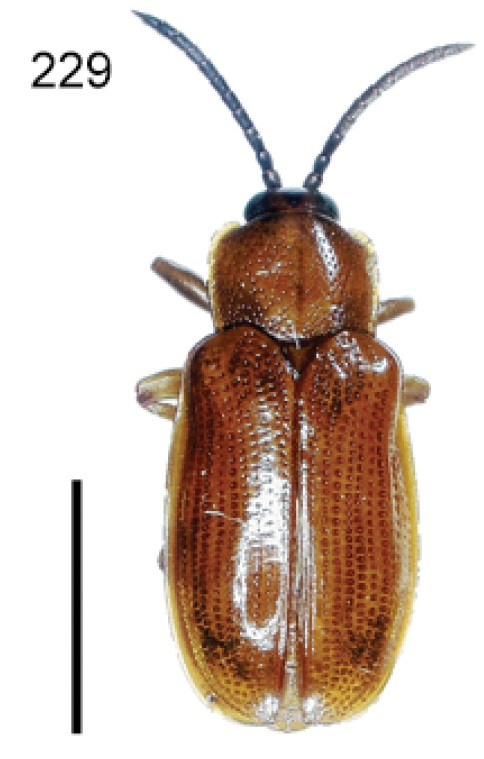

Scientific classification
- Kingdom: Animalia
- Phylum: Arthropoda
- Class: Insecta
- Order: Coleoptera
- Suborder: Polyphaga
- Infraorder: Cucujiformia
- Family: Chrysomelidae
- Genus: Cephaloleia
- Species: C. sallei

Binomial name
- Cephaloleia sallei Baly, 1858

= Cephaloleia sallei =

Species of beetle

Cephaloleia sallei is a species of beetle of the family Chrysomelidae. It is found in Costa Rica, Guatemala, Mexico and Panama.

== Description ==
Adults reach a length of about 5.2–6.4 mm. Adults are reddish-yellow with the eyes and antennae (except antennomere 1) black.

== Biology ==
Adults have been collected on Heliconia species (including Heliconia irrasa, Heliconia catheta, Heliconia latispatha, Heliconia mariae, Heliconia vaginalis and Heliconia psittacorum), Renealmia strobilifera, Calathea inocephala, Cephaloleia latifolia, Cephaloleia lutea, Pleiostachya pruinosa and Costus laevis.
