= Nympharescus aemulus =

Scientific classification
- Kingdom: Animalia
- Phylum: Arthropoda
- Clade: Pancrustacea
- Class: Insecta
- Order: Coleoptera
- Suborder: Polyphaga
- Infraorder: Cucujiformia
- Family: Chrysomelidae
- Genus: Nympharescus
- Species: N. aemulus

Binomial name
- Nympharescus aemulus (Waterhouse, 1881)

Synonyms
- Arescus aemula Waterhouse, 1881; Chelobasis aemula

Species of beetle

Nympharescus aemulus is a species of beetle of the family Chrysomelidae. It is found in Ecuador.
