= Arescus hypocrita =

Scientific classification
- Kingdom: Animalia
- Phylum: Arthropoda
- Clade: Pancrustacea
- Class: Insecta
- Order: Coleoptera
- Suborder: Polyphaga
- Infraorder: Cucujiformia
- Family: Chrysomelidae
- Genus: Arescus
- Species: A. hypocrita

Binomial name
- Arescus hypocrita Weise, 1910

Species of beetle

Arescus hypocrita is a species of beetle of the family Chrysomelidae. It is found in Bolivia and Peru.
