= Aslamidium lepidium =

Scientific classification
- Kingdom: Animalia
- Phylum: Arthropoda
- Clade: Pancrustacea
- Class: Insecta
- Order: Coleoptera
- Suborder: Polyphaga
- Infraorder: Cucujiformia
- Family: Chrysomelidae
- Genus: Aslamidium
- Species: A. lepidium

Binomial name
- Aslamidium lepidium Staines, 2006

Species of beetle

Aslamidium lepidium is a species of beetle of the family Chrysomelidae. It is found in Colombia.

== Description ==
Adults reach a length of about 4.3 mm. They have a black head, while the pronotum and elytron are both yellow, the former with one black spot, the latter with several black spots.

== Etymology ==
The species name is derived from Latin lepidum (meaning elegant) and refers to the elegant appearance of this beetle.
