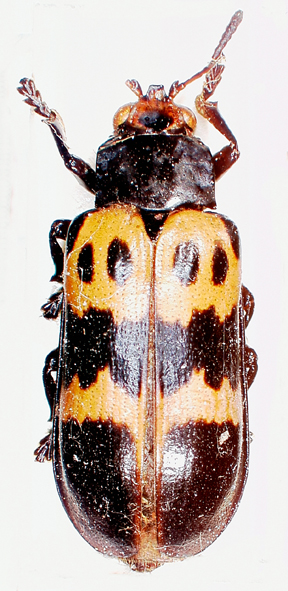

Scientific classification
- Kingdom: Animalia
- Phylum: Arthropoda
- Clade: Pancrustacea
- Class: Insecta
- Order: Coleoptera
- Suborder: Polyphaga
- Infraorder: Cucujiformia
- Family: Chrysomelidae
- Genus: Arescus
- Species: A. labiatus

Binomial name
- Arescus labiatus Perty, 1832

Synonyms
- Arescus labiatus boliviensis Pic, 1927; Arescus buquetii Guérin-Méneville, 1844; Arescus labiatus germaini Pic, 1927; Arescus labiatus multinotata Pic, 1927; Arescus labiatus subrubra Pic, 1927; Arescus variabilis Guérin-Méneville, 1844

= Arescus labiatus =

Species of beetle

Arescus labiatus is a species of beetle of the family Chrysomelidae. It is found in Bolivia, Brazil, Ecuador, French Guiana and Peru.
