= Platocthispa lateritia =

Scientific classification
- Kingdom: Animalia
- Phylum: Arthropoda
- Class: Insecta
- Order: Coleoptera
- Suborder: Polyphaga
- Infraorder: Cucujiformia
- Family: Chrysomelidae
- Genus: Platocthispa
- Species: P. lateritia

Binomial name
- Platocthispa lateritia (Smith, 1885)

Synonyms
- Odontota lateritia Smith 1885; Anoplitis lateritia; Sumitrosis lateritia

Species of beetle

Platocthispa lateritia is a species of beetle of the family Chrysomelidae. It is found in the United States (Arizona) and Mexico (Chiapas, Sonora).

== Description ==
Adults reach a length of about 5.4–6.5 mm. The antennae are black, while the legs and head are red and black. The pronotum and elytron are both red.

== Biology ==
The food plant is unknown.
