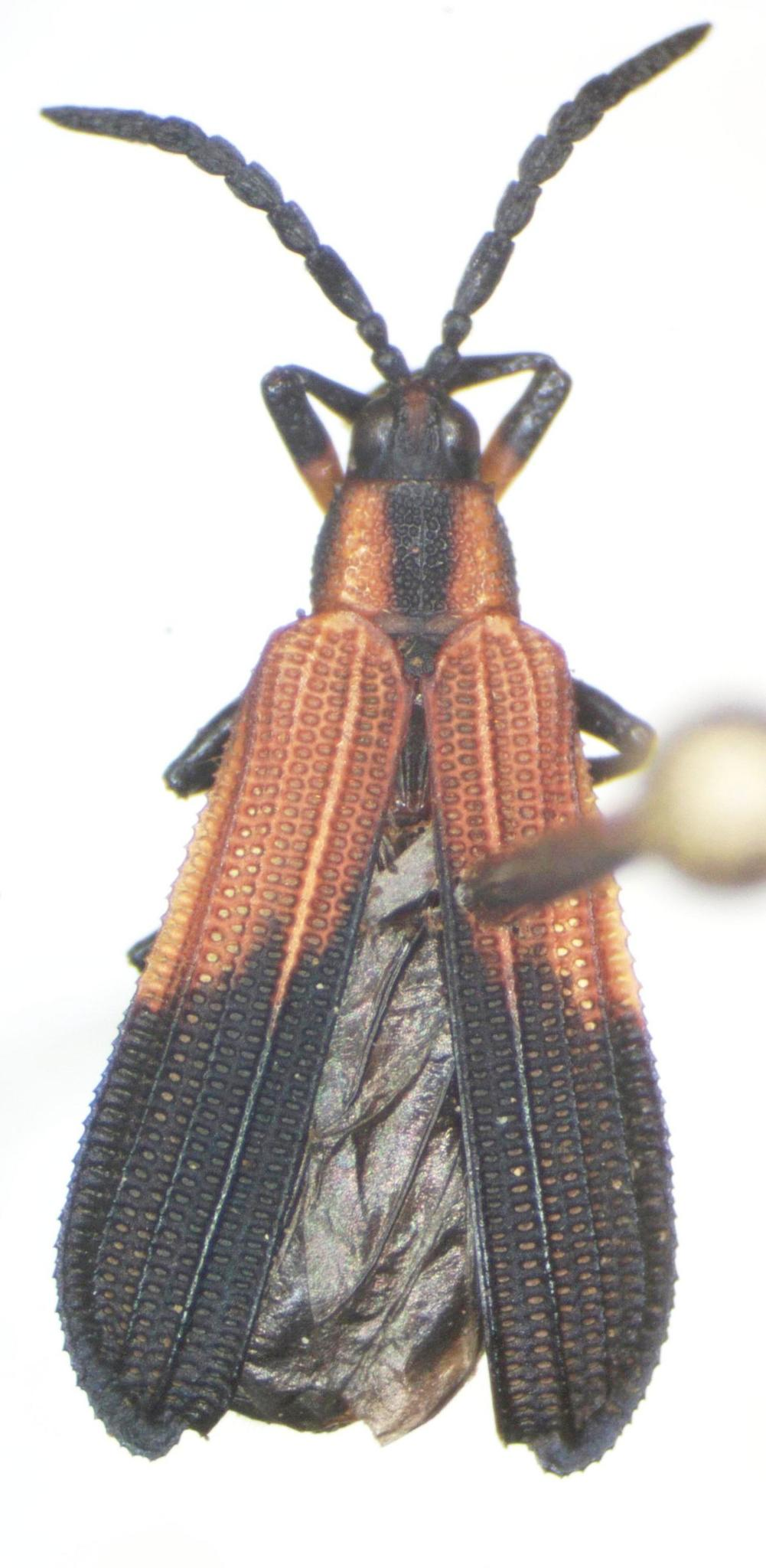

Scientific classification
- Kingdom: Animalia
- Phylum: Arthropoda
- Clade: Pancrustacea
- Class: Insecta
- Order: Coleoptera
- Suborder: Polyphaga
- Infraorder: Cucujiformia
- Family: Chrysomelidae
- Genus: Platocthispa
- Species: P. championi

Binomial name
- Platocthispa championi (Baly, 1885)

Synonyms
- Chalepus championi Baly, 1885

= Platocthispa championi =

Species of beetle

Platocthispa championi is a species of beetle of the family Chrysomelidae. It is found in Costa Rica, Panama and possibly Mexico.

== Description ==
The front is rather strongly produced between the eyes, irregularly grooved. The vertex is smooth with a patch on either side of the neck, together with one on the front, extending downwards to the base of the antennae, fulvous. The antennae nearly four fifths the length of the body. The thorax is nearly one fourth broader than long at the base, slightly converging towards the apex, with the sides subangulate, the anterior angle armed with a short oblique tooth. The upper surface cylindrical on the sides, flattened on the disc, closely covered with large, round, foveolate punctures. The medial line has a short longitudinal groove. The elytra are subparallel, slightly increasing in width towards the apex and with the lateral margin finely serrulate, while the apical margin is dilated, regularly rounded, broadly quadrate emarginate at the sutural angle, more coarsely serrulate than the sides; moderately convex, slightly flattened along the suture. Each elytron has eight longitudinal rows of large, deeply impressed punctures; the second, fourth, and sixth interspaces, together with the suture are costate.

== Biology ==
The recorded food plants are Piper species.
