= Aslamidium strandi =

Scientific classification
- Kingdom: Animalia
- Phylum: Arthropoda
- Clade: Pancrustacea
- Class: Insecta
- Order: Coleoptera
- Suborder: Polyphaga
- Infraorder: Cucujiformia
- Family: Chrysomelidae
- Genus: Aslamidium
- Species: A. strandi

Binomial name
- Aslamidium strandi (Uhmann, 1930)

Synonyms
- Demothispa strandi Uhmann, 1930

Species of beetle

Aslamidium strandi is a species of beetle of the family Chrysomelidae. It is found in Costa Rica, Nicaragua and Panama.

== Biology ==
The recorded food plants are Spermacoce and Calathea species.
