= Platocthispa apicicornis =

Scientific classification
- Kingdom: Animalia
- Phylum: Arthropoda
- Class: Insecta
- Order: Coleoptera
- Suborder: Polyphaga
- Infraorder: Cucujiformia
- Family: Chrysomelidae
- Genus: Platocthispa
- Species: P. apicicornis

Binomial name
- Platocthispa apicicornis (Weise, 1905)

Synonyms
- Uroplata apicicornis Weise, 1905

Species of beetle

Platocthispa apicicornis is a species of beetle of the family Chrysomelidae. It is found in Peru.

== Description ==
Adults reach a length of about 6.7 mm. Adults are black, with an anterior spot, the forehead and a narrow band sublateral to the prothorax yellow. The antennae, apex and an interrupted fascia on the elytron are pale yellow.

== Biology ==
The food plant is unknown.
