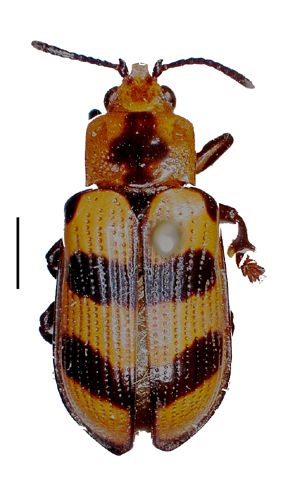
- Chelobasis perplexa

Scientific classification
- Kingdom: Animalia
- Phylum: Arthropoda
- Clade: Pancrustacea
- Class: Insecta
- Order: Coleoptera
- Suborder: Polyphaga
- Infraorder: Cucujiformia
- Family: Chrysomelidae
- Subfamily: Cassidinae
- Tribe: Arescini
- Genus: Chelobasis; Gray, 1832

= Chelobasis =

Genus of leaf beetles

Chelobasis is a genus of beetles belonging to the family Chrysomelidae.

== Species ==
- Chelobasis bicolor Gray, 1832
- Chelobasis perplexa (Baly, 1858)
