= Platocthispa consociata =

Scientific classification
- Kingdom: Animalia
- Phylum: Arthropoda
- Class: Insecta
- Order: Coleoptera
- Suborder: Polyphaga
- Infraorder: Cucujiformia
- Family: Chrysomelidae
- Genus: Platocthispa
- Species: P. consociata

Binomial name
- Platocthispa consociata (Baly, 1885)

Synonyms
- Uroplata consociata Baly, 1885

Species of beetle

Platocthispa consociata is a species of beetle of the family Chrysomelidae. It is found in Guatemala and Mexico (Oaxaca, Veracruz).

== Description ==
The upper surface is transversely convex, transversely depressed on the hinder disc, coarsely rugose-punctate, the medial line with a faint longitudinal groove. There is a black medial vitta, usually abbreviated anteriorly and the lateral margin is narrowly blackish-piceous or black. The elytra are subparallel, subacutely rounded at the apex, conjointly emarginate at the sutural angle and finely serrulate. Each elytron has eight regular rows of large transversely oblong punctures, the second, fourth, and sixth interspaces are slightly elevated.

== Biology ==
The food plant is unknown.
