= Aslamidium flavomaculata =

Scientific classification
- Kingdom: Animalia
- Phylum: Arthropoda
- Clade: Pancrustacea
- Class: Insecta
- Order: Coleoptera
- Suborder: Polyphaga
- Infraorder: Cucujiformia
- Family: Chrysomelidae
- Genus: Aslamidium
- Species: A. flavomaculata

Binomial name
- Aslamidium flavomaculata Staines, 2006

Species of beetle

Aslamidium flavomaculata is a species of beetle of the family Chrysomelidae. It is found in Colombia, Ecuador and Panama.

== Biology ==
The food plant is unknown.
