= Aslamidium impurum =

Scientific classification
- Kingdom: Animalia
- Phylum: Arthropoda
- Clade: Pancrustacea
- Class: Insecta
- Order: Coleoptera
- Suborder: Polyphaga
- Infraorder: Cucujiformia
- Family: Chrysomelidae
- Genus: Aslamidium
- Species: A. impurum

Binomial name
- Aslamidium impurum (Boheman, 1850)

Synonyms
- Himatidium impurum Boheman, 1850; Himatidium foveicolle Boheman, 1862

Species of beetle

Aslamidium impurum is a species of beetle of the family Chrysomelidae. It is found in Brazil, Colombia, Costa Rica, Ecuador, Guatemala, Honduras, Mexico, Nicaragua and Panama.

== Description ==
The elytron is either uniformly yellow or has some vague brown to black spots on the anterior.

== Biology ==
The recorded host plants are Calathea ovata, Calathea virginalis, Calathea insignis, Calathea micans and Heliconia species.
