= Aslamidium quatuordecimmaculatum =

Scientific classification
- Kingdom: Animalia
- Phylum: Arthropoda
- Clade: Pancrustacea
- Class: Insecta
- Order: Coleoptera
- Suborder: Polyphaga
- Infraorder: Cucujiformia
- Family: Chrysomelidae
- Genus: Aslamidium
- Species: A. quatuordecimmaculatum

Binomial name
- Aslamidium quatuordecimmaculatum (Latreille, 1811)

Synonyms
- Himatidium quatuordecimmaculatum Latreille, 1811

Species of beetle

Aslamidium quatuordecimmaculatum is a species of beetle of the family Chrysomelidae. It is found in Brazil, Colombia, Ecuador, Peru, Suriname and Venezuela.

== Biology ==
The host plant is unknown.
