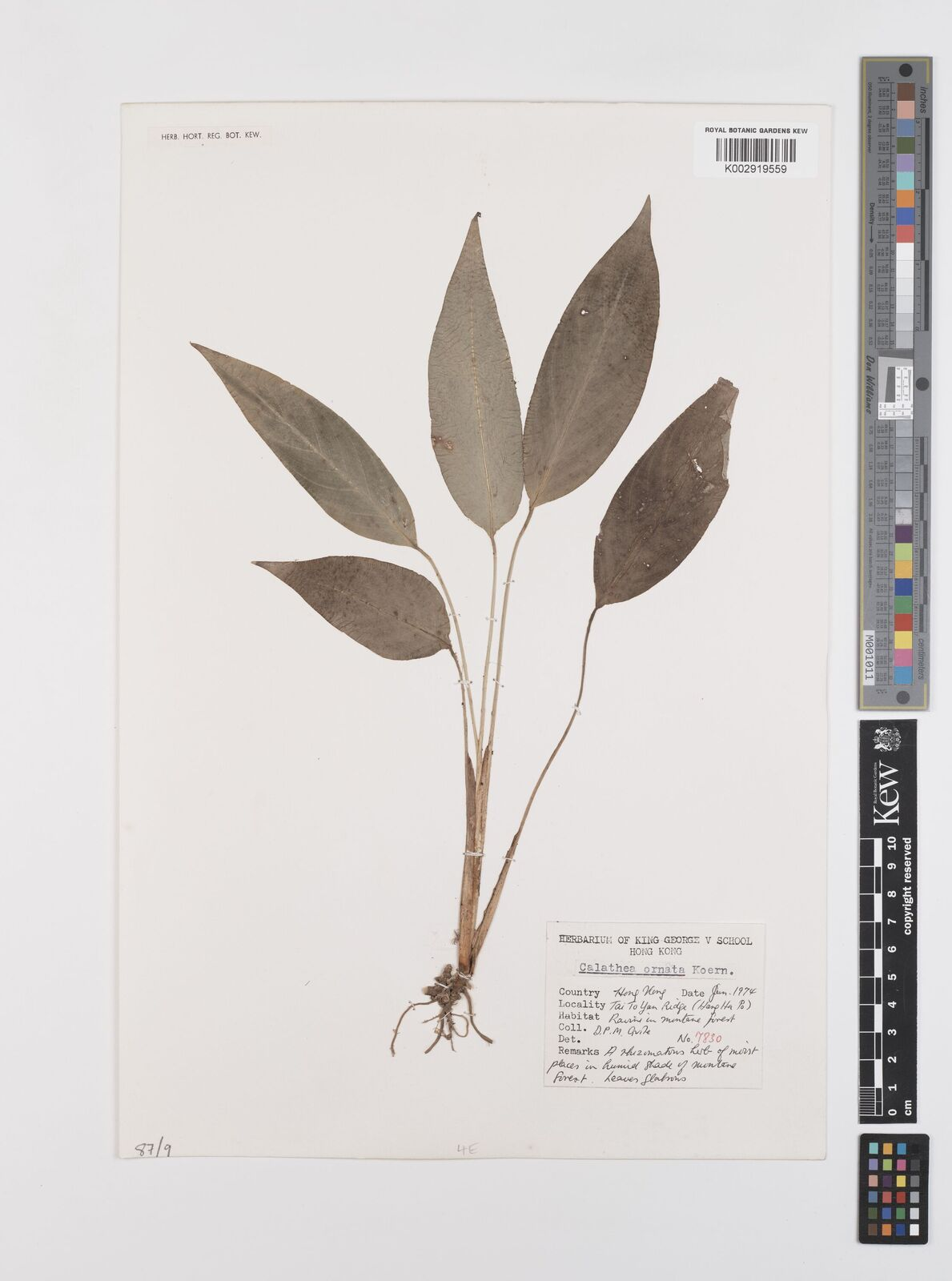

Scientific classification
- Kingdom: Plantae
- Clade: Tracheophytes
- Clade: Angiosperms
- Clade: Monocots
- Clade: Commelinids
- Order: Zingiberales
- Family: Marantaceae
- Genus: Goeppertia
- Species: G. ornata

Binomial name
- Goeppertia ornata (Linden) Borchs. & S.Suárez

Synonyms
- Calathea arrecta Lindl. & André; Calathea ornata (Linden) Körn.; Maranta albolineata (Körn.) Regel; Maranta coriifolia Regel, Gartenflora 28: 295 (1879).; Maranta ornata Linden ex Lem. (basionym); Maranta roseolineata (Körn.) Linden; Phrynium ornatum (Linden) K.Koch; Phyllodes arrecta (Lindl. & André; Phyllodes ornata (Linden) Kuntze

= Goeppertia ornata =

Species of flowering plant

Goeppertia ornata (syn. Calathea ornata), is a species of perennial plant from the genus Goeppertia in the family known as the prayer plants. It is native to Colombia and Venezuela. This species belongs to the group of Goeppertia called the Ornata clade.

== A confusion... ==
While the horticultural industry sells "pinstripe calathea" houseplants as Goeppertia ornata or Calathea ornata,

Marantaceae expert Helen Kennedy states that these are actually Goeppertia sanderiana or Goeppertia majestica. Goeppertia ornata is much more difficult to grow and disappeared from cultivation some time prior to the mid-1990s.

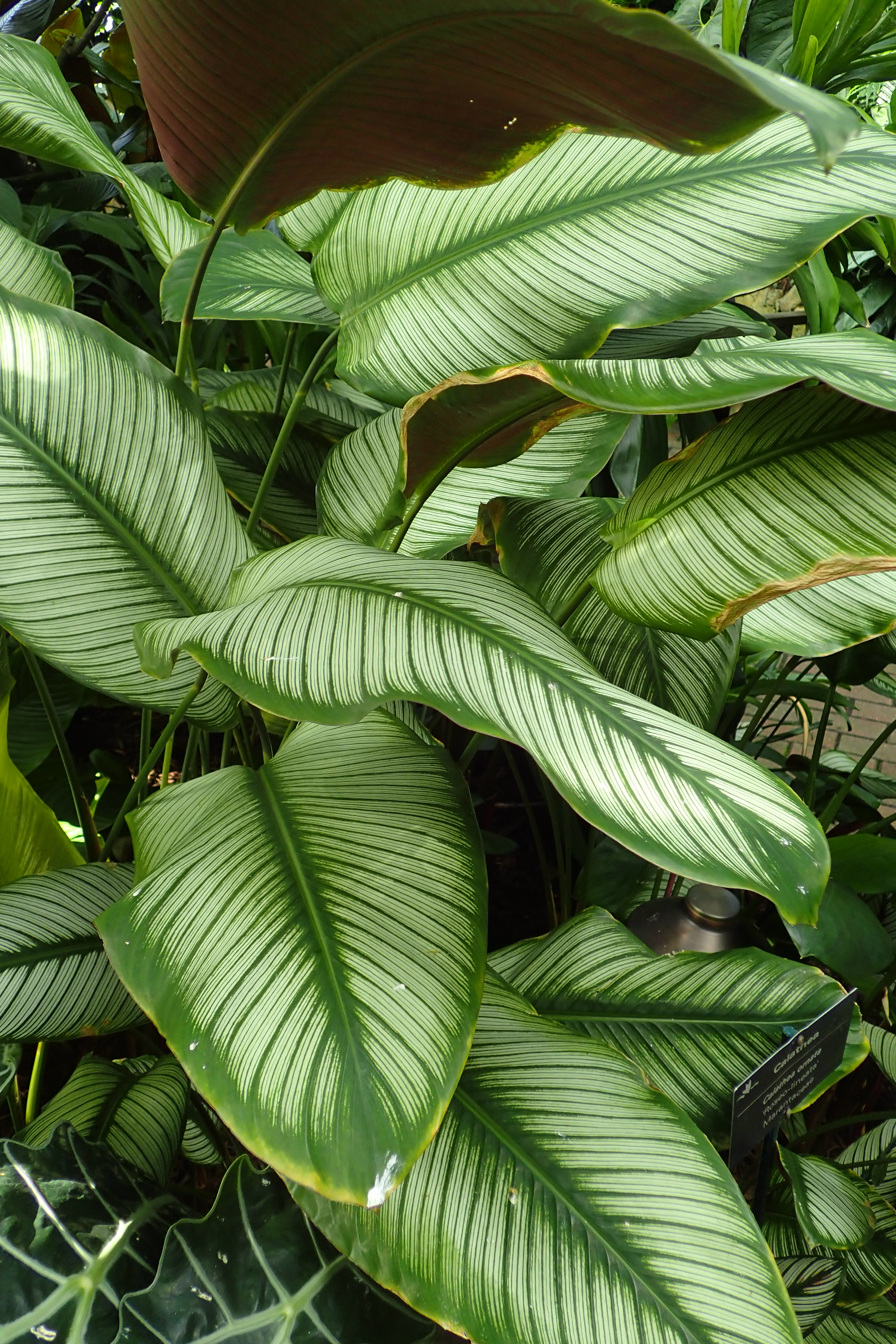
Goeppertia majestica

Goeppertia sanderiana

== Description ==
Goeppertia ornata has dark green leaves with a pink or white striped pattern on the upper side of the leaf. The bottom side of the leaves is purple when juvenile and then becomes green as the plant matures. The inflorescence of this species is a small spike shaped group of bracts. Unfortunately, as this species disappeared from cultivation and is hard to be found in the wild, the color of the bracts and flowers is unknown. The main characteristic to recognize a true G.ornata is by the presence of small hair on the surface of the leaf.
