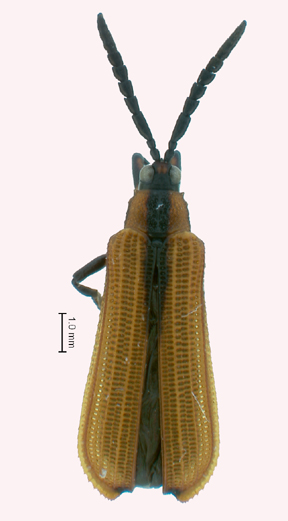

Scientific classification
- Kingdom: Animalia
- Phylum: Arthropoda
- Class: Insecta
- Order: Coleoptera
- Suborder: Polyphaga
- Infraorder: Cucujiformia
- Family: Chrysomelidae
- Genus: Platocthispa
- Species: P. gregorii

Binomial name
- Platocthispa gregorii (Chapuis, 1877)

Synonyms
- Odontota gregorii Chapuis, 1877; Uroplata (Uroplata) aberrans Chapuis, 1877

= Platocthispa gregorii =

Species of beetle

Platocthispa gregorii is a species of beetle of the family Chrysomelidae. It is found in Colombia, Costa Rica and Mexico (Veracruz).

== Description ==
The vertex and front are smooth, the latter finely carinate. The antennae are about half the length of the body and slender. The thorax is nearly one half broader than long, the sides converging from the base towards the middle, very slightly rounded. The upper surface is transversely convex, transversely excavated on the hinder disc. It is closely rugose-punctate, with a subtorulose vitta on either side, just within the lateral margin, rather less closely punctured than the rest of the surface. The elytra are very narrowly ovate, subacutely rounded at the apex, subquadrate-emarginate at the sutural angle. The outer margin is minutely serrulate, narrowly dilated on the sides, more distinctly so at the apex. Each elytron has eight regular rows of large, transversely oblong punctures.

== Biology ==
The food plant is unknown.
