= Platocthispa =

Scientific classification
- Kingdom: Animalia
- Phylum: Arthropoda
- Clade: Pancrustacea
- Class: Insecta
- Order: Coleoptera
- Suborder: Polyphaga
- Infraorder: Cucujiformia
- Family: Chrysomelidae
- Subfamily: Cassidinae
- Tribe: Chalepini
- Genus: Platocthispa; Uhmann, 1939

Genus of leaf beetles

Platocthispa is a genus of beetles belonging to the family Chrysomelidae.

== Species ==
- Platocthispa apicicornis (Weise, 1905)
- Platocthispa championi (Baly, 1885)
- Platocthispa consociata (Baly, 1885)
- Platocthispa emorsitans (Baly, 1885)
- Platocthispa fulvescens (Baly, 1885)
- Platocthispa gregorii (Chapuis, 1877)
- Platocthispa lateritia (Smith, 1885)
