= Nympharescus ocellatus =

Scientific classification
- Kingdom: Animalia
- Phylum: Arthropoda
- Clade: Pancrustacea
- Class: Insecta
- Order: Coleoptera
- Suborder: Polyphaga
- Infraorder: Cucujiformia
- Family: Chrysomelidae
- Genus: Nympharescus
- Species: N. ocellatus

Binomial name
- Nympharescus ocellatus Weise, 1910

Species of beetle

Nympharescus ocellatus is a species of beetle of the family Chrysomelidae. It is found in Colombia and Ecuador.
