= Platocthispa fulvescens =

Scientific classification
- Kingdom: Animalia
- Phylum: Arthropoda
- Class: Insecta
- Order: Coleoptera
- Suborder: Polyphaga
- Infraorder: Cucujiformia
- Family: Chrysomelidae
- Genus: Platocthispa
- Species: P. fulvescens

Binomial name
- Platocthispa fulvescens (Baly, 1885)

Synonyms
- Uroplata fulvescens Baly, 1885; Octhispa fulvescens insignata Pic, 1933

Species of beetle

Platocthispa fulvescens is a species of beetle of the family Chrysomelidae. It is found in Costa Rica, El Salvador, Guatemala and Panama.

== Description ==
The head is smooth and impunctate and the antennae are filiform, with the first and second joints short, while the third joint is longer than the preceding two united. The thorax is nearly half as broad again as long, with the sides straight and nearly parallel from the base to beyond the middle, then obliquely converging to the apex, the anterior angle armed with a short subacute tooth. The upper surface rugose-punctate, the medial line with a fine longitudinal groove. The extreme lateral margin (together with a discoidal vitta) is black. The scutellum is also black. The elytra are subelongate, parallel, very slightly dilated towards the posterior angle, rounded at the apex and distinctly emarginate at the suture. They are finely serrulate, the serratures rather more distinct on the apical margin. Each elytron has eight regular rows of punctures, with all the interspaces, from the first to the sixth, slightly prominent, but not distinctly costate.

== Biology ==
The recorded food plant is Cassia oxyphylla.
