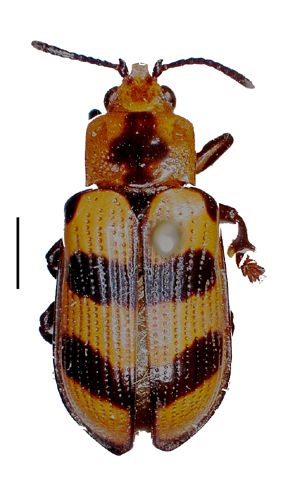
- Chelobasis perplexa

Scientific classification
- Kingdom: Animalia
- Phylum: Arthropoda
- Clade: Pancrustacea
- Class: Insecta
- Order: Coleoptera
- Suborder: Polyphaga
- Infraorder: Cucujiformia
- Family: Chrysomelidae
- Subfamily: Cassidinae
- Tribe: Arescini; Chapuis, 1875

Genera
- see text

= Arescini =

Tribe of leaf beetles

Arescini is a tribe of leaf beetles within the subfamily Cassidinae.

== Genera ==
The following are included in BioLib.cz:

1. Arescus Perty, 1832
2. Chelobasis Gray, 1832
3. Nympharescus Weise, 1905
4. Xenarescus Weise, 1905
