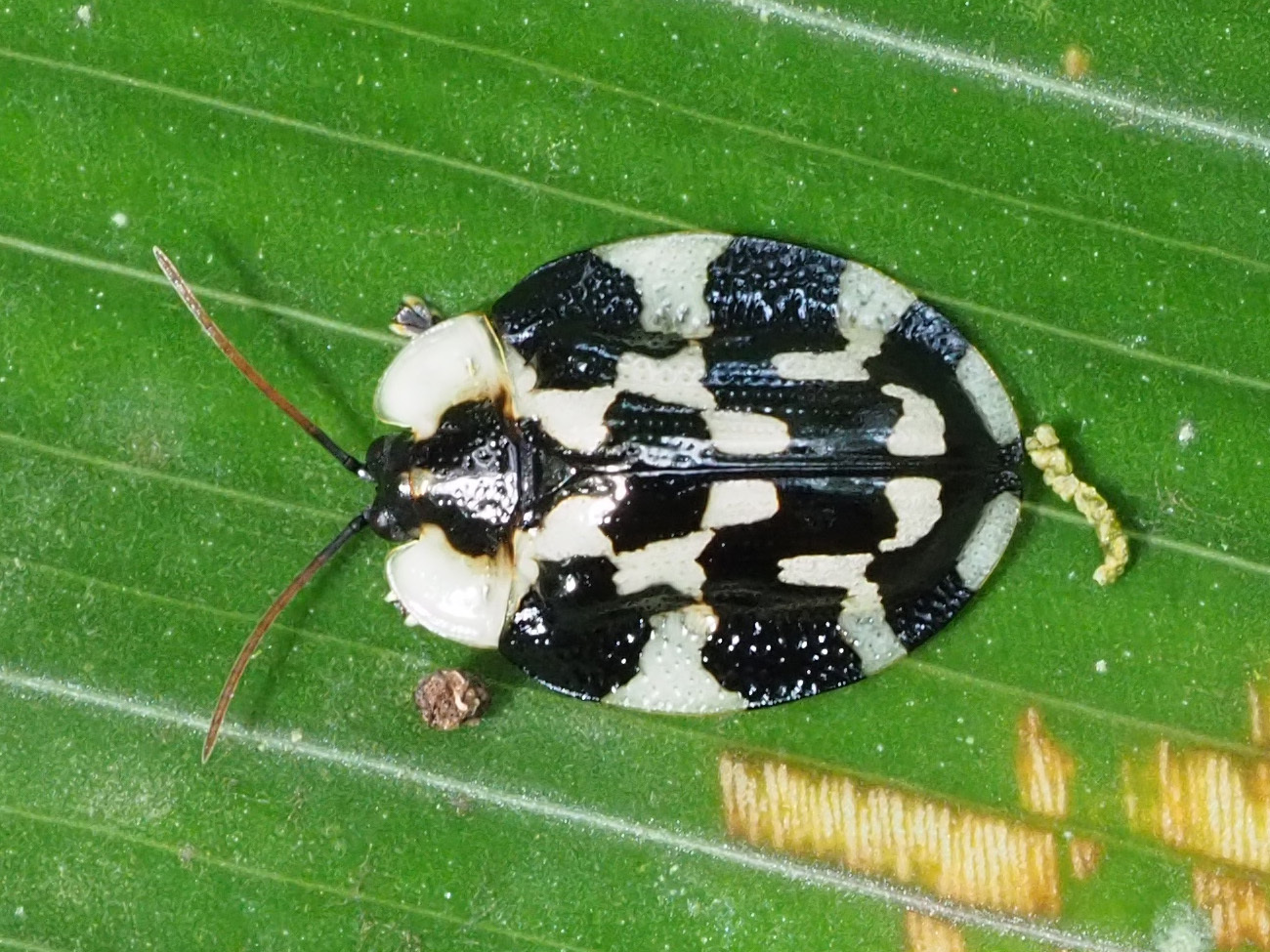

Scientific classification
- Kingdom: Animalia
- Phylum: Arthropoda
- Clade: Pancrustacea
- Class: Insecta
- Order: Coleoptera
- Suborder: Polyphaga
- Infraorder: Cucujiformia
- Family: Chrysomelidae
- Genus: Aslamidium
- Species: A. capense

Binomial name
- Aslamidium capense (Herbst, 1799)

Synonyms
- Cassida capense Herbst, 1799; Himatidium capense; Imatidium capense; Imatidium fasciatum Fabricius, 1801; Himatidium comptum Perty, 1834; Himatidium semifasciatum Boheman, 1856; Himatidium capense ab. cincticolle Weise, 1921

= Aslamidium capense =

Species of beetle

Aslamidium capense is a species of beetle of the family Chrysomelidae. It is found in Bolivia, Brazil (Amazonas, Pará, Pernambuco), Colombia, Ecuador, French Guiana, Peru and Venezuela.

== Description ==
Adults reach a length of about 6 mm.

== Biology ==
It has been recorded feeding on Calathea species.
