= Cephaloleia apertura =

Scientific classification
- Kingdom: Animalia
- Phylum: Arthropoda
- Clade: Pancrustacea
- Class: Insecta
- Order: Coleoptera
- Suborder: Polyphaga
- Infraorder: Cucujiformia
- Family: Chrysomelidae
- Genus: Cephaloleia
- Species: C. apertura

Binomial name
- Cephaloleia apertura (Staines, 2013)

Synonyms
- Aslamidium (Neoaslamidium) apertura Staines, 2013

Species of beetle

Cephaloleia apertura is a species of beetle of the family Chrysomelidae. It is found in Venezuela.

== Description ==
Adults reach a length of about 4.3 mm. They have a brown head, infuscated with black. The pronotum is black, with the anterior one-fifth and lateral margin yellow. The elytron is yellow with a black diffuse pattern forming 16 isolated spots.
