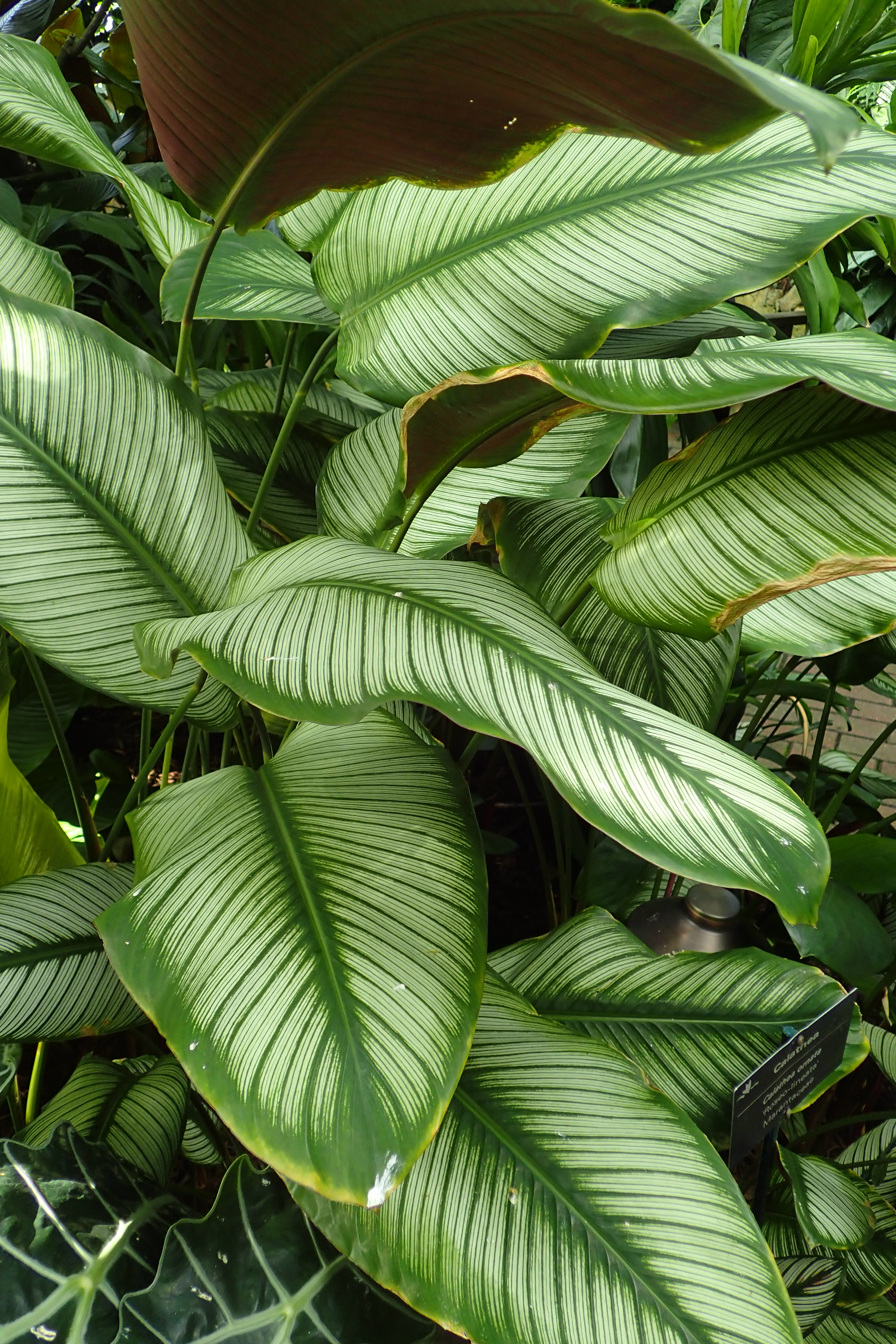

Scientific classification
- Kingdom: Plantae
- Clade: Tracheophytes
- Clade: Angiosperms
- Clade: Monocots
- Clade: Commelinids
- Order: Zingiberales
- Family: Marantaceae
- Genus: Goeppertia
- Species: G. majestica

Binomial name
- Goeppertia majestica (Linden) Borchs. & S.Suárez

Synonyms
- List: Calathea gigas Gagnep.; Calathea imperialis (Burgerstein & Abel) L.H.Bailey & Raffill; Calathea majestica (Linden) H.Kenn.; Calathea princeps (Linden) Regel; Maranta imperialis Burgerstein & Abel; Maranta majestica Linden; Maranta princeps Linden; Phyllodes princeps (Linden) Kuntze

= Goeppertia majestica =

Species of flowering plant

Goeppertia majestica (syn. Calathea majestica), the majestic prayer plant, is a species of flowering plant in the family Marantaceae. It is native to Colombia, Ecuador, Peru, Bolivia, Guyana, and northern Brazil, and has been introduced to Venezuela. Goeppertia majestica belongs to one of the groups of Goeppertia called the Ornata clade.

== Uses ==
In the Amazon, the leaves of G. majestica (referred to as Calathea gigas) are traditionally used for lining baskets for holding fish, and as thatch.

As an ornamental, G. majestica has attractive foliage and can be grown both indoors and in outdoor gardens.

A large member of its genus, it has gained the Royal Horticultural Society's Award of Garden Merit.

== Description ==
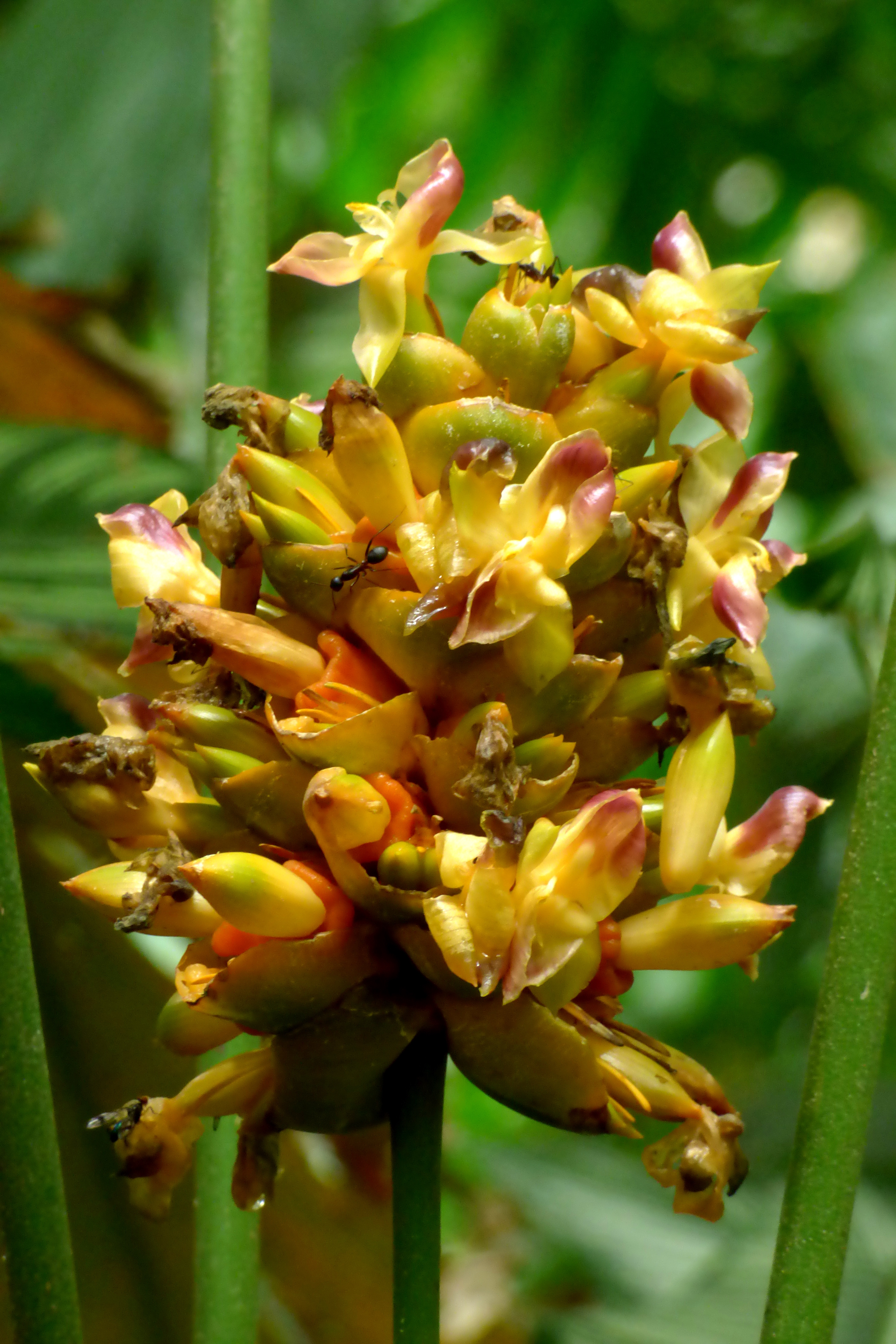
Inflorescence of Goeppertia majestica

Goeppertia majestica has wide, long green leaves with a pink or white striped pattern on the upper side of the leaf. The pattern often disappear on mature leaves. The bottom side of the leaves can vary from purple to green and each leaf is hold by a tall and thick petiole. The inflorescence of Goeppertia majestica is made of multiple yellow bracts on a peduncle. The flowers colors are cream and purple.

== A confusion... ==
Goeppertia majestica is often sold as Pin-stripe Calathea or Calathea ornata. While this species do exist, the plant that is sold around the world is either Goeppertia sanderiana or Goeppertia majestica The real Goeppertia ornata is a very rare striped pattern species of Goeppertia native to Venezuela and Colombia and disappeared from cultivation some time prior to the mid-1990s.
