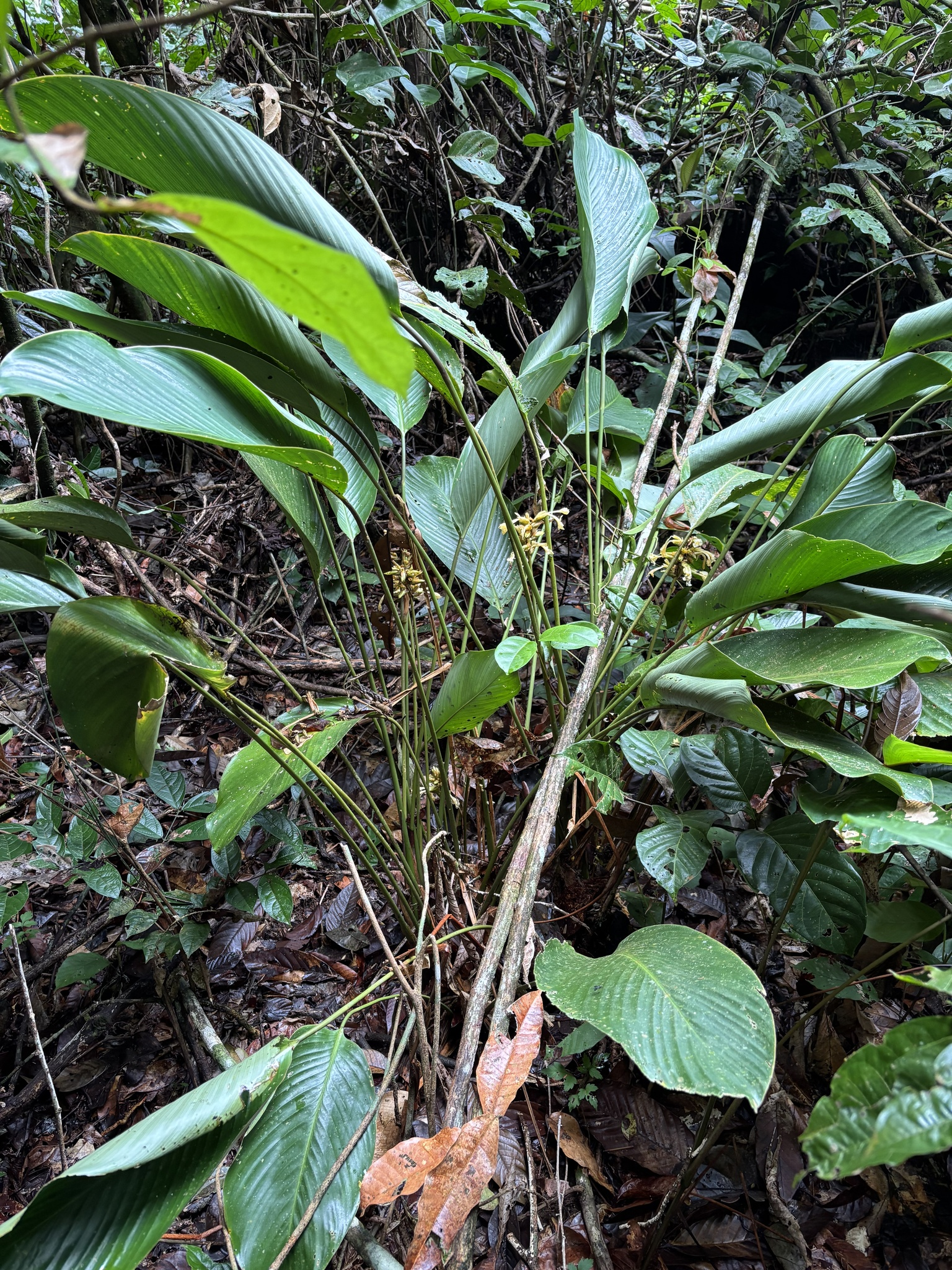

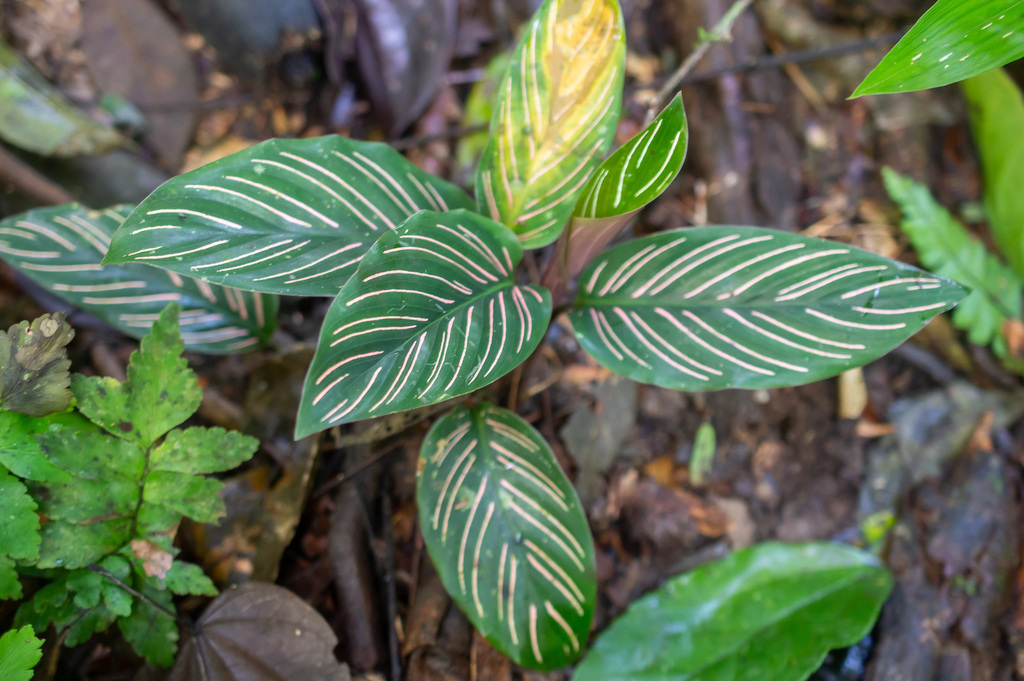

Scientific classification
- Kingdom: Plantae
- Clade: Tracheophytes
- Clade: Angiosperms
- Clade: Monocots
- Clade: Commelinids
- Order: Zingiberales
- Family: Marantaceae
- Genus: Goeppertia
- Species: G. elliptica

Binomial name
- Goeppertia elliptica (Roscoe) Borchs. & S.Suárez

Synonyms
- Calathea elliptica (Roscoe) K.Schum.; Phrynium ellipticum Roscoe

= Goeppertia elliptica =

Species of plant

Goeppertia elliptica is a species of plant from the genus Goeppertia in the family Marantaceae. It is native to Colombia, French Guiana, Guyana, Suriname, Venezuela, and parts of Brazil. It was described by William Roscoe as Phrynium ellipticum in 1827. The cultivar 'Vittata' is grown horticulturally. This species belongs to the sub-group of Goeppertia called the Ornata clade.

== Description ==
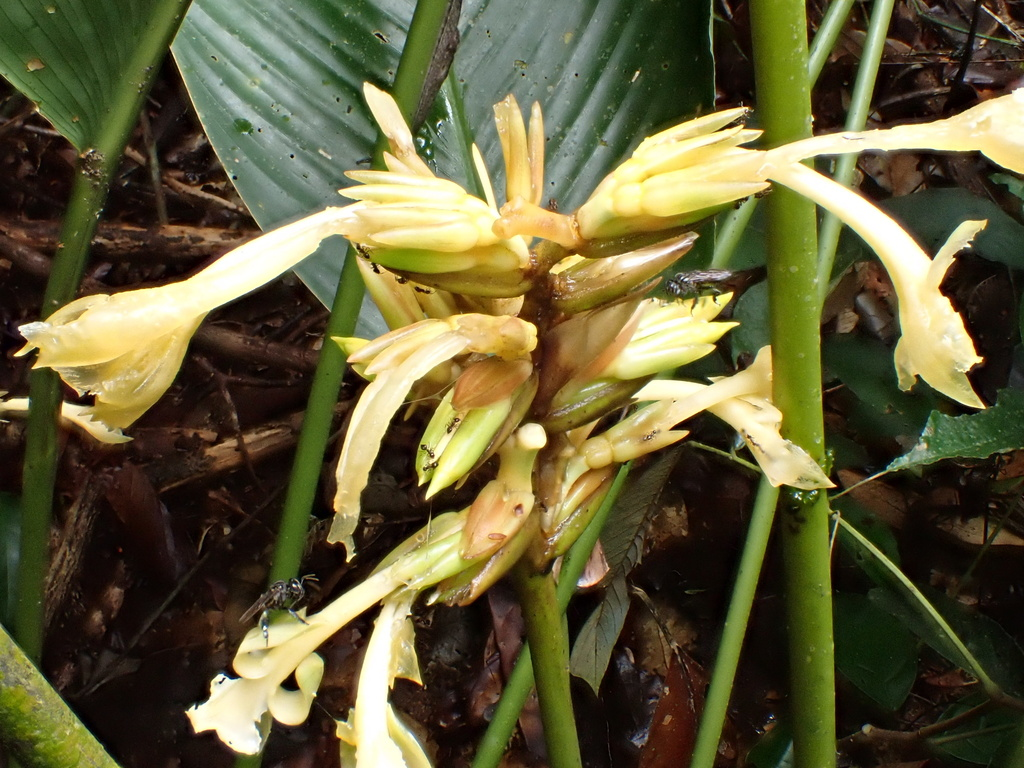
Inflorescence of Goeppertia elliptica

Goeppertia elliptica is a medium-sized plant, with wide green leaves, long, green petioles and a long pulvinus. Juvenile plants often have pink or white lines above, which makes it a member of the Ornata group. With maturity, the pattern disappears and either becomes plain green or develops a brush pattern. The brush pattern consists of two broad, longitudinal, yellowish-green bands on each side of the leaf. The inflorescence of G. elliptica is composed of multiple spike shaped bracts arranged spirally around a thin, green peduncle. The bracts are green with a brownish shade and the flowers are cream-colored.

== Uses ==
In Guyana, the leaves of Goeppertia elliptica are used for wrapping, such as wrapping fish to roast.
