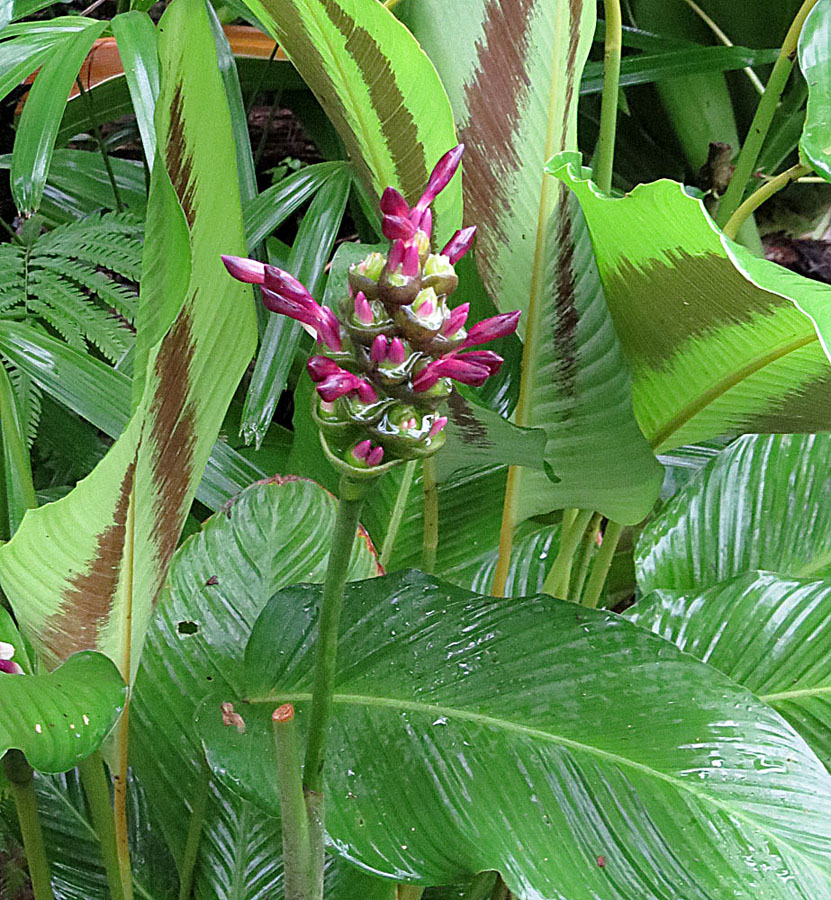

Scientific classification
- Kingdom: Plantae
- Clade: Embryophytes
- Clade: Tracheophytes
- Clade: Spermatophytes
- Clade: Angiosperms
- Clade: Monocots
- Clade: Commelinids
- Order: Zingiberales
- Family: Marantaceae
- Genus: Goeppertia
- Species: G. latifolia

Binomial name
- Goeppertia latifolia (Willd. ex Link) Borchs. & S.Suárez

Synonyms
- Calathea latifolia (Willd. ex Link) Klotzsch

= Goeppertia latifolia =

Species of flowering plant

Goeppertia latifolia is a species of plant in the family Marantaceae. Its native range is Panama to Ecuador and Trinidad. It is used as a food and medicine. Prehistoric Lucayan migrants to the Bahamas brought Goeppertia latifolia with them from their ancestral homelands. The flowers of Goeppertia latifolia do not open spontaneously.
