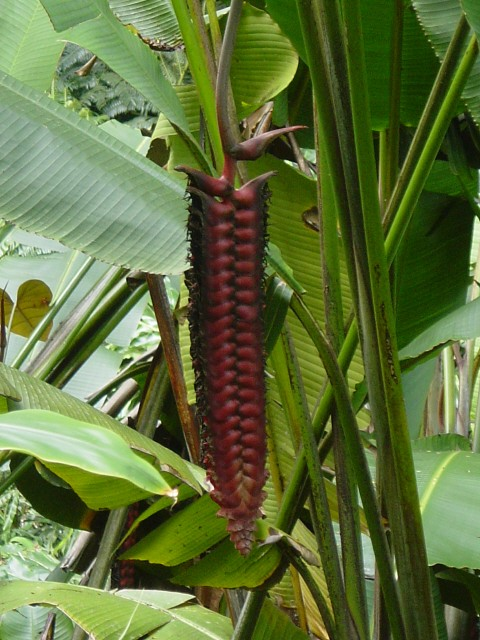
- inflorescence

Scientific classification
- Kingdom: Plantae
- Clade: Tracheophytes
- Clade: Angiosperms
- Clade: Monocots
- Clade: Commelinids
- Order: Zingiberales
- Family: Heliconiaceae
- Genus: Heliconia
- Species: H. mariae

Binomial name
- Heliconia mariae Hook.f., 1863

Synonyms
- Bihai elegans (Petersen) Kuntze, 1891; Bihaia elegans Kuntze, 1891; Bihai mariae (Hook.f.) Kuntze; Bihai punicea Griggs; Heliconia elegans Petersen; Heliconia punicea (Griggs) L.B.Sm.

= Heliconia mariae =

Species of flowering plant

Heliconia mariae is a species of flowering plants in the family Heliconiaceae. It is found in North-West South America and Central America.
