= Cephaloleia fernandoi =

Scientific classification
- Kingdom: Animalia
- Phylum: Arthropoda
- Class: Insecta
- Order: Coleoptera
- Suborder: Polyphaga
- Infraorder: Cucujiformia
- Family: Chrysomelidae
- Genus: Cephaloleia
- Species: C. fernandoi

Binomial name
- Cephaloleia fernandoi (Bondar, 1940)

Synonyms
- Himatidium fernandoi Bondar, 1940

Species of beetle

Cephaloleia fernandoi is a species of beetle of the family Chrysomelidae. It is found in Brazil (Bahia).

== Description ==
Adults reach a length of about 6 mm.

== Biology ==
Adults have been collected on the inflorescence of Calathea ovata and Calathea virginalis.

== Taxonomy ==
The species was long treated as a synonym of Cephaloleia opaca, but was reinstated as a valid species in 2017.
