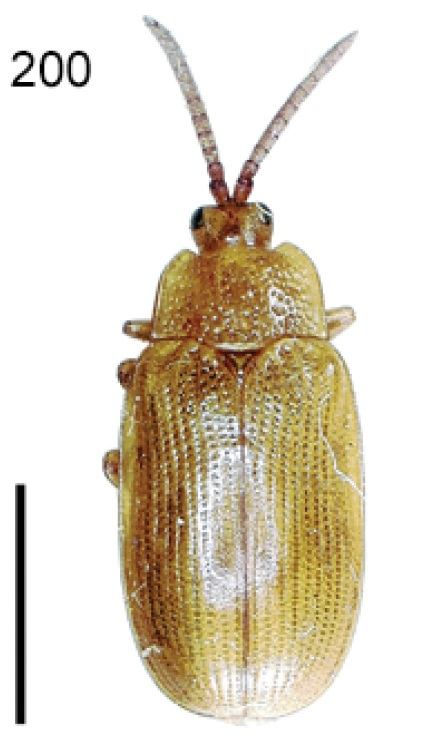

Scientific classification
- Kingdom: Animalia
- Phylum: Arthropoda
- Class: Insecta
- Order: Coleoptera
- Suborder: Polyphaga
- Infraorder: Cucujiformia
- Family: Chrysomelidae
- Genus: Cephaloleia
- Species: C. opaca

Binomial name
- Cephaloleia opaca Baly, 1858

= Cephaloleia opaca =

Species of beetle

Cephaloleia opaca is a species of beetle of the family Chrysomelidae. It is found in Brazil (Bahia, Rio de Janeiro, Santa Catharina). Records from Peru and Venezuela seem to be based on misidentifications.

== Description ==
Adults reach a length of about 6.5–6.8 mm. Adults are pale yellow, with the eyes, antennae and pleurae darker and the elytron with the suture behind the middle with an indistinct dark macula.

== Biology ==
The recorded host plants for this species are Calathea ovata and Cephaloleia virginalis.
