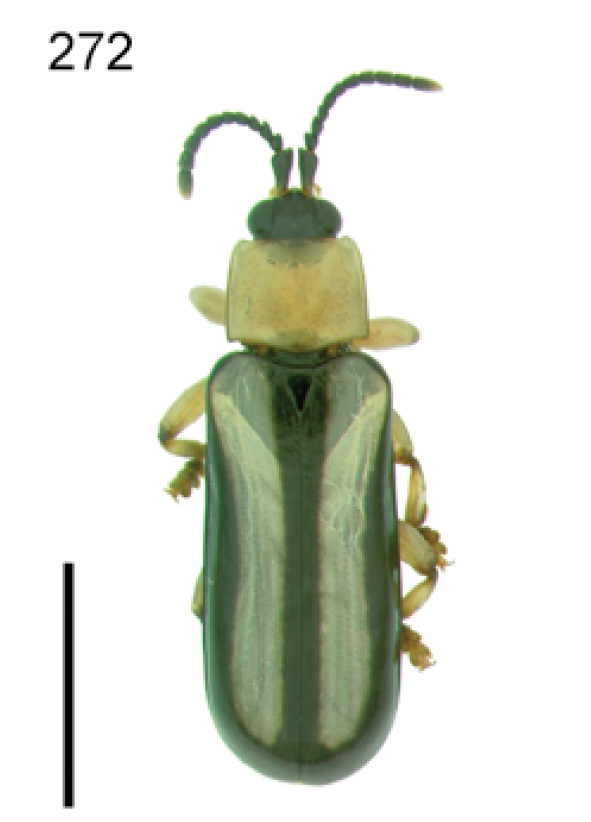

Scientific classification
- Kingdom: Animalia
- Phylum: Arthropoda
- Class: Insecta
- Order: Coleoptera
- Suborder: Polyphaga
- Infraorder: Cucujiformia
- Family: Chrysomelidae
- Genus: Cephaloleia
- Species: C. kressi

Binomial name
- Cephaloleia kressi García-Robledo, 2014

= Cephaloleia kressi =

Species of beetle

Cephaloleia kressi is a species of beetle of the family Chrysomelidae. It is found in Costa Rica.

== Description ==
Adults reach a length of about 7–7.6 mm. They have a black head. The antennae are also black, except for the apex of antennomere 11. The pronotum is yellow and the elytron is black with a longitudinal yellow vitta from the humerus to near the apex. The legs are yellow.

== Biology ==
The recorded host plant is Heliconia lankesteri.

== Etymology ==
The species is named for W. John Kress in recognition of his many contributions to the understanding of the ecology and evolution of plant animal interactions, in particular between plants from the order Zingiberales, their pollinators and Cephaloleia insect herbivores.
