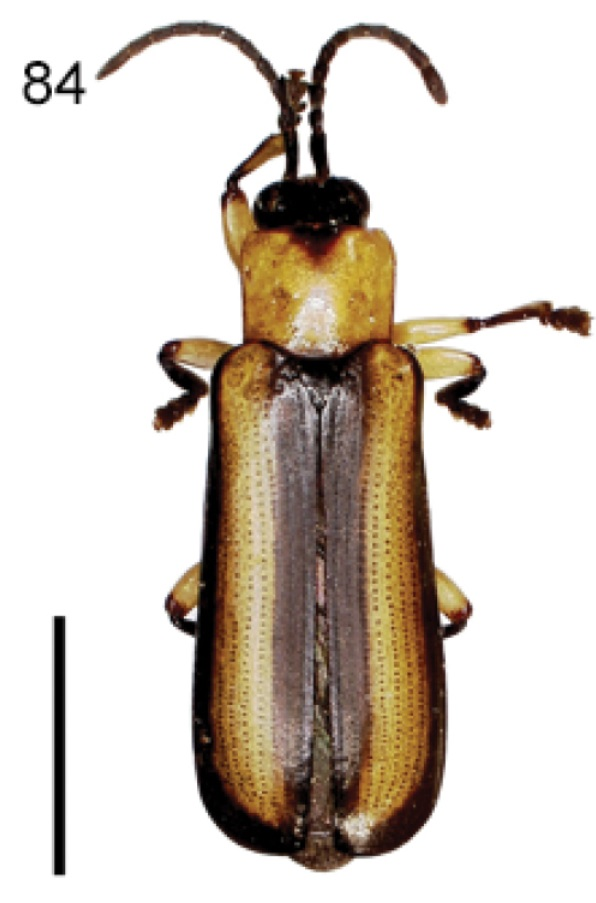

Scientific classification
- Kingdom: Animalia
- Phylum: Arthropoda
- Class: Insecta
- Order: Coleoptera
- Suborder: Polyphaga
- Infraorder: Cucujiformia
- Family: Chrysomelidae
- Genus: Cephaloleia
- Species: C. bella

Binomial name
- Cephaloleia bella Baly, 1885

= Cephaloleia bella =

Species of beetle

Cephaloleia bella is a species of beetle of the family Chrysomelidae. It is found in Colombia, Costa Rica, Mexico and Panama.

== Description ==
Adults reach a length of about 7.6–8.1 mm. The head, antennae and scutellum are black, while the pronotum is yellow with a black medial macula on the anterior and basal margins. The elytron is black with a yellow vitta.

== Biology ==
The foodplant is unknown, but adults have been collected on Heliconia imbricata.
