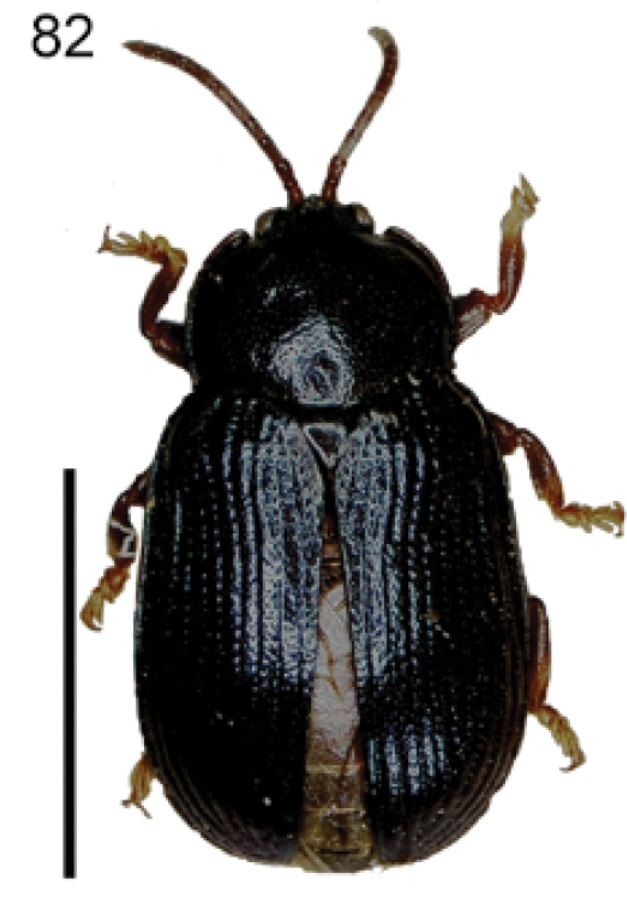

Scientific classification
- Kingdom: Animalia
- Phylum: Arthropoda
- Clade: Pancrustacea
- Class: Insecta
- Order: Coleoptera
- Suborder: Polyphaga
- Infraorder: Cucujiformia
- Family: Chrysomelidae
- Genus: Cephaloleia
- Species: C. barroi

Binomial name
- Cephaloleia barroi Uhmann, 1959

= Cephaloleia barroi =

Species of beetle

Cephaloleia barroi is a species of beetle of the family Chrysomelidae. It is found in Cuba.

== Description ==
Adults reach a length of about 4.8 mm. Adults are bright metallic blue, while the antennae and legs are yellow.
