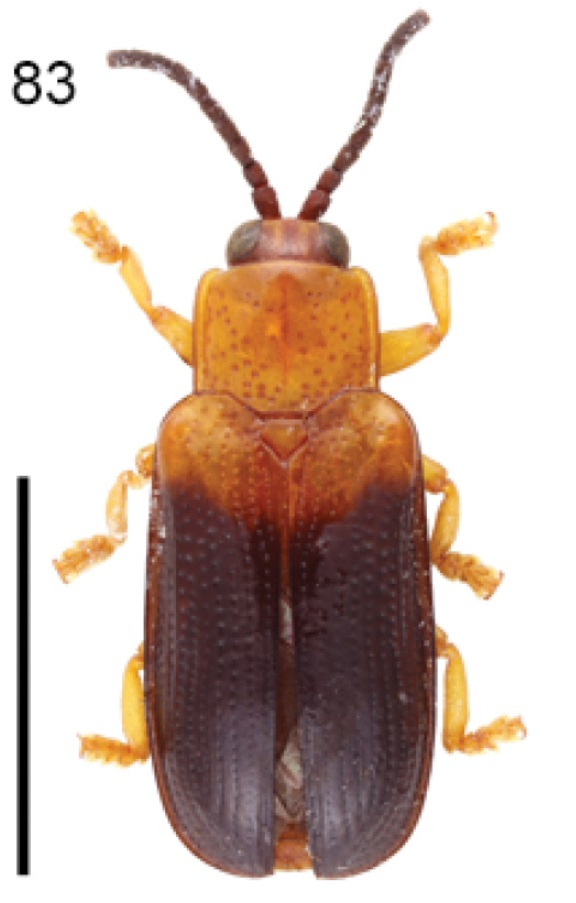

Scientific classification
- Kingdom: Animalia
- Phylum: Arthropoda
- Clade: Pancrustacea
- Class: Insecta
- Order: Coleoptera
- Suborder: Polyphaga
- Infraorder: Cucujiformia
- Family: Chrysomelidae
- Genus: Cephaloleia
- Species: C. pici

Binomial name
- Cephaloleia pici Sekerka, 2014

Synonyms
- Cephaloleia basalis Pic, 1926 (preocc.)

= Cephaloleia pici =

Species of beetle

Cephaloleia pici is a species of beetle of the family Chrysomelidae. It is found in Brazil (Espírito Santo).

== Description ==
Adults reach a length of about 5 mm. Adults are testaceous. The elytron is black with a reddish base. The antennae are black with antennomeres 1–2 reddish. The legs are yellowish.
