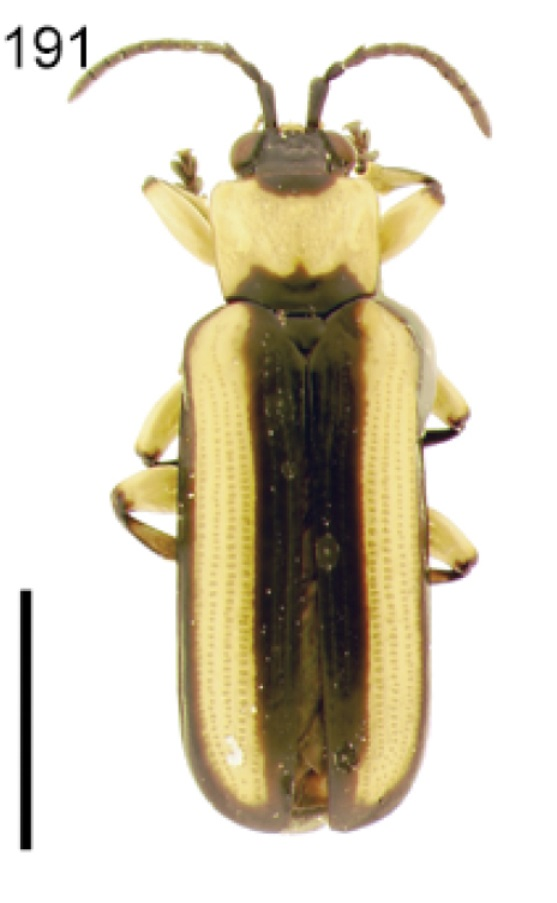

Scientific classification
- Kingdom: Animalia
- Phylum: Arthropoda
- Class: Insecta
- Order: Coleoptera
- Suborder: Polyphaga
- Infraorder: Cucujiformia
- Family: Chrysomelidae
- Genus: Cephaloleia
- Species: C. nevermanni

Binomial name
- Cephaloleia nevermanni Uhmann, 1930

= Cephaloleia nevermanni =

Species of beetle

Cephaloleia nevermanni is a species of beetle of the family Chrysomelidae. It is found in Costa Rica and Panama.

== Description ==
Adults reach a length of about 7–8.5 mm. Adults are yellow, while the head, antennae and scutellum are black. The pronotum has black anterior and posterior maculae and the elytron is yellow with a black sutural vitta.

== Biology ==
The recorded host plant is Calathea insignis and adults have been collected feeding on Heliconia imbricata and Calathea macrosepala.
