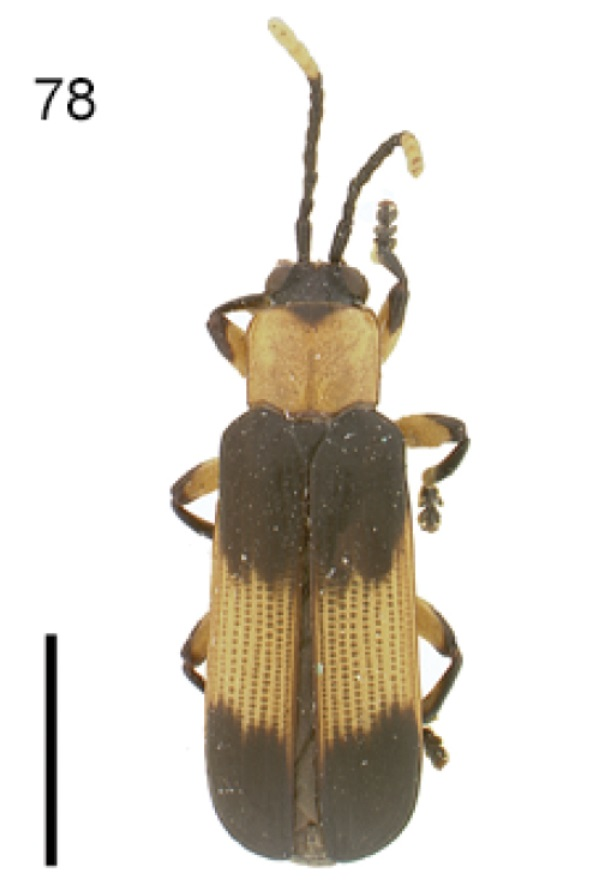

Scientific classification
- Kingdom: Animalia
- Phylum: Arthropoda
- Class: Insecta
- Order: Coleoptera
- Suborder: Polyphaga
- Infraorder: Cucujiformia
- Family: Chrysomelidae
- Genus: Cephaloleia
- Species: C. applicata

Binomial name
- Cephaloleia applicata Pic, 1923

= Cephaloleia applicata =

Species of beetle

Cephaloleia applicata is a species of beetle of the family Chrysomelidae. It is found in Ecuador.

== Description ==
Adults reach a length of about 5.5–5.8 mm. Adults are yellowish-brown, with a black head. The antennomeres 1–7 are black and 8–11 yellowish. The pronotum has a black triangular macula just behind the head and the basal and apical one-third of the elytron is black.
