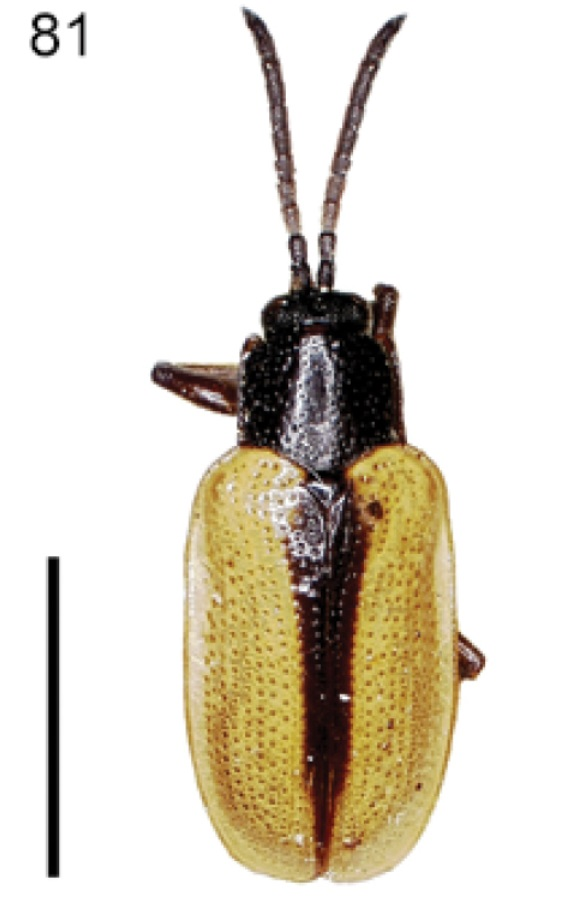

Scientific classification
- Kingdom: Animalia
- Phylum: Arthropoda
- Class: Insecta
- Order: Coleoptera
- Suborder: Polyphaga
- Infraorder: Cucujiformia
- Family: Chrysomelidae
- Genus: Cephaloleia
- Species: C. balyi

Binomial name
- Cephaloleia balyi Duvivier, 1890

= Cephaloleia balyi =

Species of beetle

Cephaloleia balyi is a species of beetle of the family Chrysomelidae. It is found in Ecuador.

== Description ==
Adults reach a length of about 5.3–5.6 mm. Adults are testaceous, while the legs are yellow. Antennomeres 1–2 are black and 3–11 are brown. The head, meso-, and metasterna are black and the pronotum is brownish-black. The elytron is yellowish with a black vitta.
