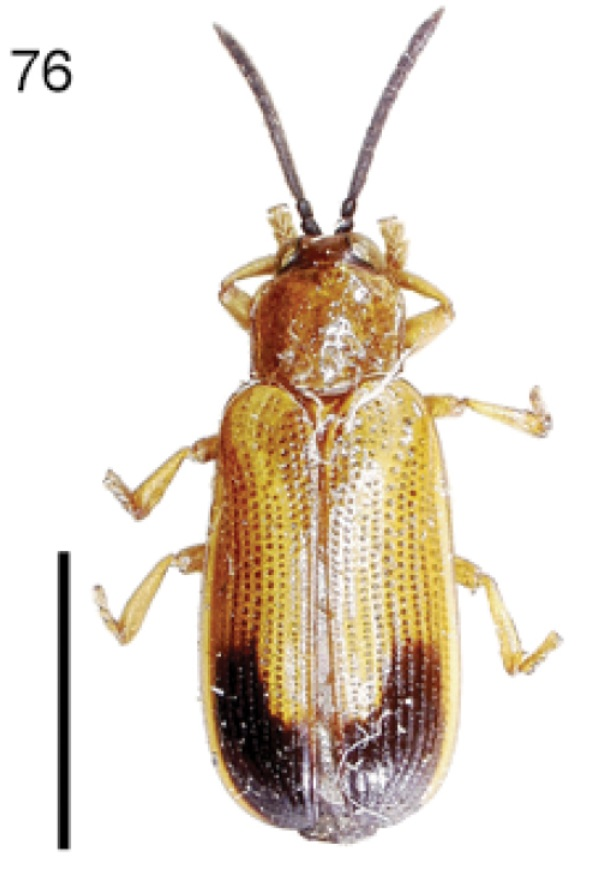

Scientific classification
- Kingdom: Animalia
- Phylum: Arthropoda
- Class: Insecta
- Order: Coleoptera
- Suborder: Polyphaga
- Infraorder: Cucujiformia
- Family: Chrysomelidae
- Genus: Cephaloleia
- Species: C. apicenotata

Binomial name
- Cephaloleia apicenotata Uhmann, 1938

= Cephaloleia apicenotata =

Species of beetle

Cephaloleia apicenotata is a species of beetle of the family Chrysomelidae. It is found in Brazil (Bahia) and Ecuador.

== Description ==
Adults reach a length of about 6.2–6.6 mm. Adults are yellowish-brown, with the antennae, a u-shaped marking on the apical one-third of the elytron and the last sternite with apical margin black.
