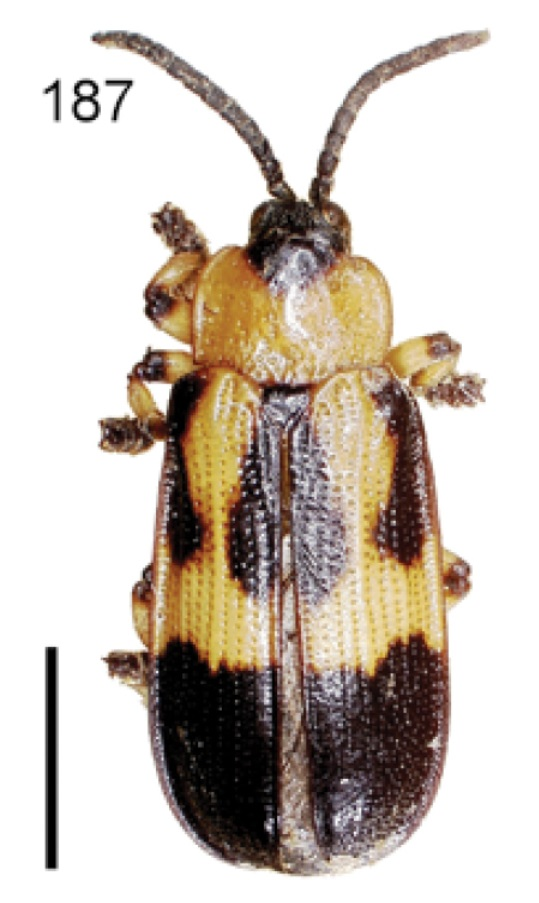

Scientific classification
- Kingdom: Animalia
- Phylum: Arthropoda
- Class: Insecta
- Order: Coleoptera
- Suborder: Polyphaga
- Infraorder: Cucujiformia
- Family: Chrysomelidae
- Genus: Cephaloleia
- Species: C. maxima

Binomial name
- Cephaloleia maxima Uhmann, 1942

Synonyms
- Uhmannispa maculata Monrós and Viana, 1947

= Cephaloleia maxima =

Species of beetle

Cephaloleia maxima is a species of beetle of the family Chrysomelidae. It is found in Argentina.

== Description ==
Adults reach a length of about 8.5–9.2 mm. The head, antennae and scutellum are black, while the pronotum is orangy-yellow, with a triangular black macula. The elytron is orangy-yellow, with three black maculae.

== Biology ==
The recorded food plant is Ananas macrodentes.
