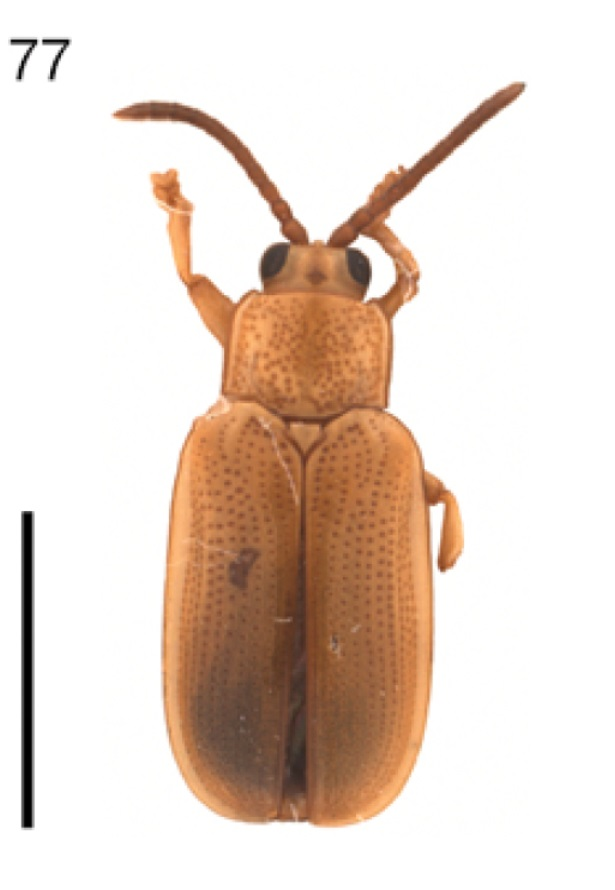

Scientific classification
- Kingdom: Animalia
- Phylum: Arthropoda
- Class: Insecta
- Order: Coleoptera
- Suborder: Polyphaga
- Infraorder: Cucujiformia
- Family: Chrysomelidae
- Genus: Cephaloleia
- Species: C. apicicornis

Binomial name
- Cephaloleia apicicornis Baly, 1869

= Cephaloleia apicicornis =

Species of beetle

Cephaloleia apicicornis is a species of beetle of the family Chrysomelidae. It is found in Brazil (Bahia, Rio de Janeiro).

== Description ==
Adults reach a length of about 5.5–5.8 mm. Adults are yellowish, with antennomeres 1–8 brownish and 9–11 darker.
