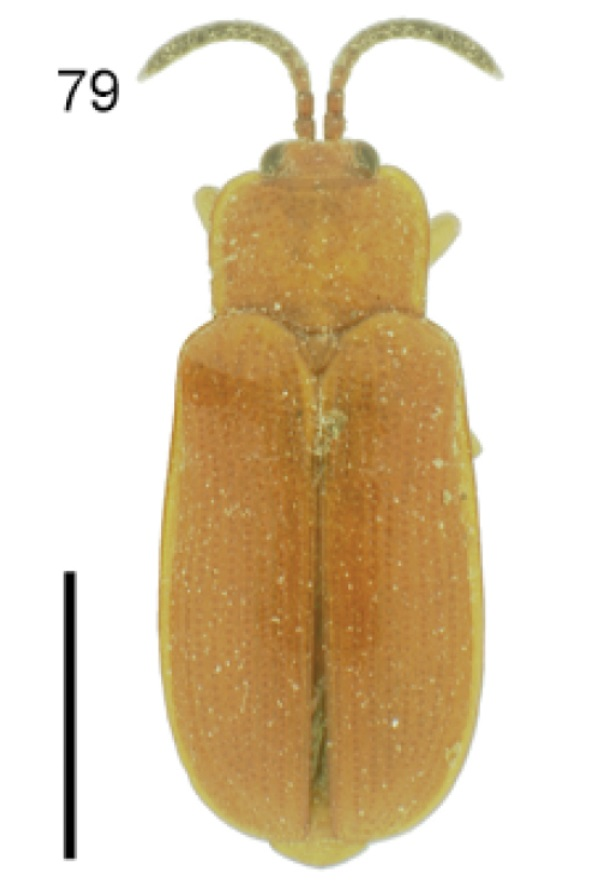

Scientific classification
- Kingdom: Animalia
- Phylum: Arthropoda
- Clade: Pancrustacea
- Class: Insecta
- Order: Coleoptera
- Suborder: Polyphaga
- Infraorder: Cucujiformia
- Family: Chrysomelidae
- Genus: Cephaloleia
- Species: C. approximata

Binomial name
- Cephaloleia approximata Baly, 1869

= Cephaloleia approximata =

Species of beetle

Cephaloleia approximata is a species of beetle of the family Chrysomelidae. It is found in Brazil and Peru.

== Description ==
Adults reach a length of about 7.2–7.6 mm. Adults are reddish-brown, with the eyes and antennomeres 6–11 darker and the legs yellowish.
