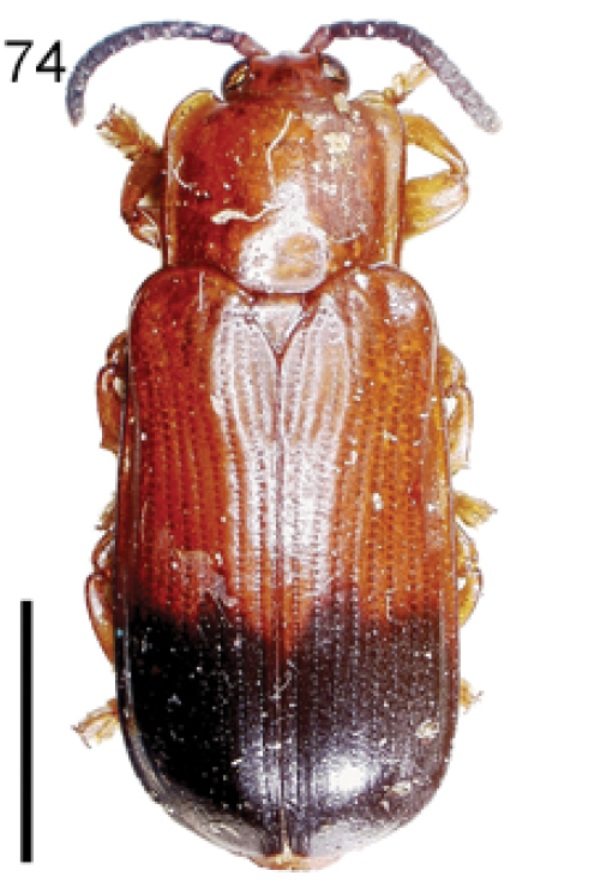

Scientific classification
- Kingdom: Animalia
- Phylum: Arthropoda
- Class: Insecta
- Order: Coleoptera
- Suborder: Polyphaga
- Infraorder: Cucujiformia
- Family: Chrysomelidae
- Genus: Cephaloleia
- Species: C. apicalis

Binomial name
- Cephaloleia apicalis Baly, 1858

= Cephaloleia apicalis =

Species of beetle

Cephaloleia apicalis is a species of beetle of the family Chrysomelidae. It is found in Colombia.

== Description ==
Adults reach a length of about 7.8–9 mm. Adults are reddish-yellow, with the antennae (except the basal antennomere), eyes, and apical one-third of the elytron darker.
