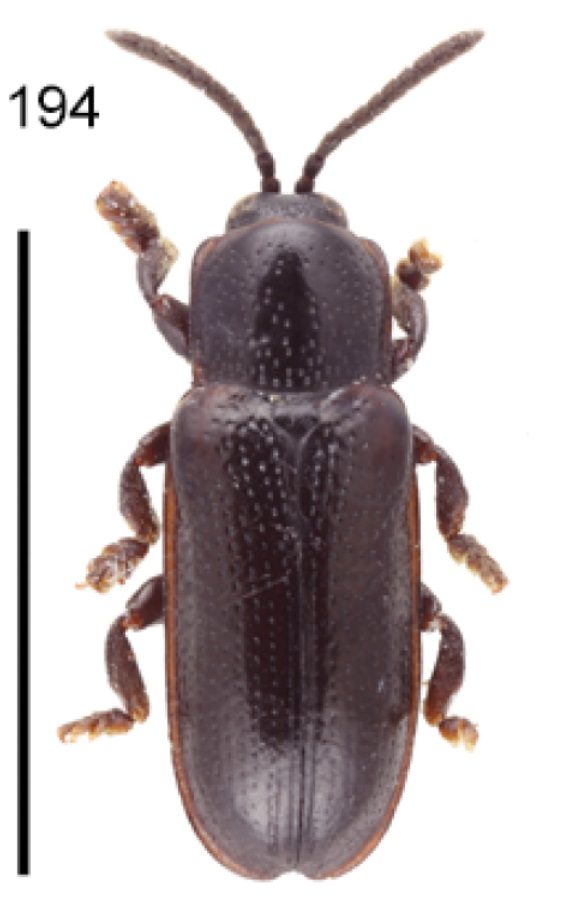

Scientific classification
- Kingdom: Animalia
- Phylum: Arthropoda
- Class: Insecta
- Order: Coleoptera
- Suborder: Polyphaga
- Infraorder: Cucujiformia
- Family: Chrysomelidae
- Genus: Cephaloleia
- Species: C. nigrithorax

Binomial name
- Cephaloleia nigrithorax Pic, 1930

= Cephaloleia nigrithorax =

Species of beetle

Cephaloleia nigrithorax is a species of beetle of the family Chrysomelidae. It is found in Colombia, Ecuador and Venezuela.

== Description ==
Adults reach a length of about 2.9–3.1 mm. Adults are black with a slightly metallic-blue sheen. The elytron is lightly margined in red.
