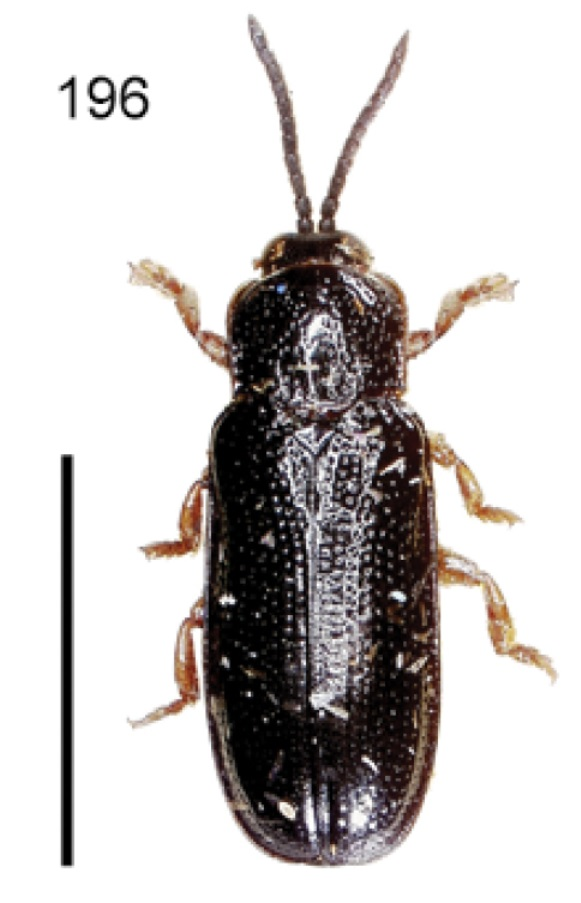

Scientific classification
- Kingdom: Animalia
- Phylum: Arthropoda
- Class: Insecta
- Order: Coleoptera
- Suborder: Polyphaga
- Infraorder: Cucujiformia
- Family: Chrysomelidae
- Genus: Cephaloleia
- Species: C. nitida

Binomial name
- Cephaloleia nitida Uhmann, 1930

= Cephaloleia nitida =

Species of beetle

Cephaloleia nitida is a species of beetle of the family Chrysomelidae. It is found in Argentina and Brazil (Santa Catharina, São Paulo).

== Description ==
Adults reach a length of about 4.3–4.7 mm. Adults are dark metallic blue-black, with the palps and legs reddish-yellow.
