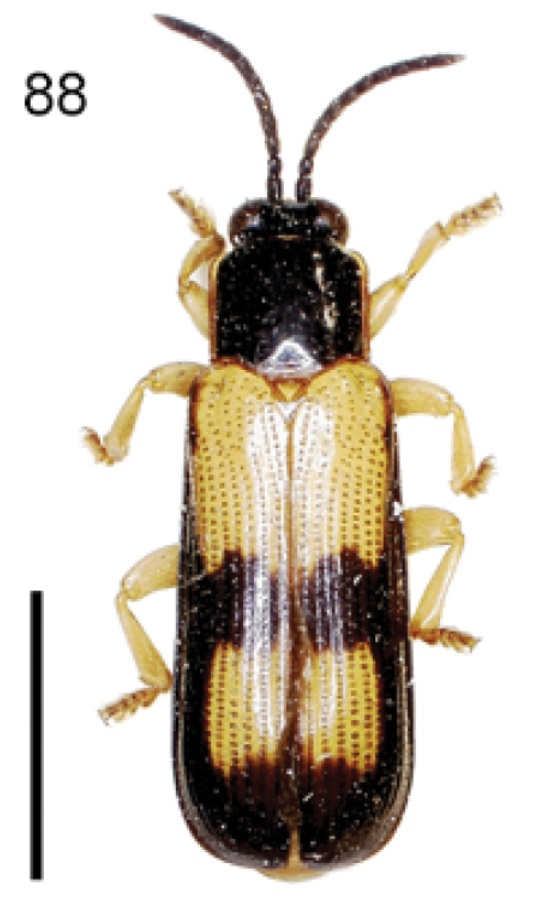

Scientific classification
- Kingdom: Animalia
- Phylum: Arthropoda
- Class: Insecta
- Order: Coleoptera
- Suborder: Polyphaga
- Infraorder: Cucujiformia
- Family: Chrysomelidae
- Genus: Cephaloleia
- Species: C. bifasciata

Binomial name
- Cephaloleia bifasciata Weise, 1905

= Cephaloleia bifasciata =

Species of beetle

Cephaloleia bifasciata is a species of beetle of the family Chrysomelidae. It is found in Ecuador.

== Description ==
Adults reach a length of about 6.8–7.2 mm. Adults are yellowish, while the head, antennae and pronotum (except for paler lateral and basal margins) are black. The elytron is yellowish with the lateral and apical margins black and a black transverse band beyond the middle.
