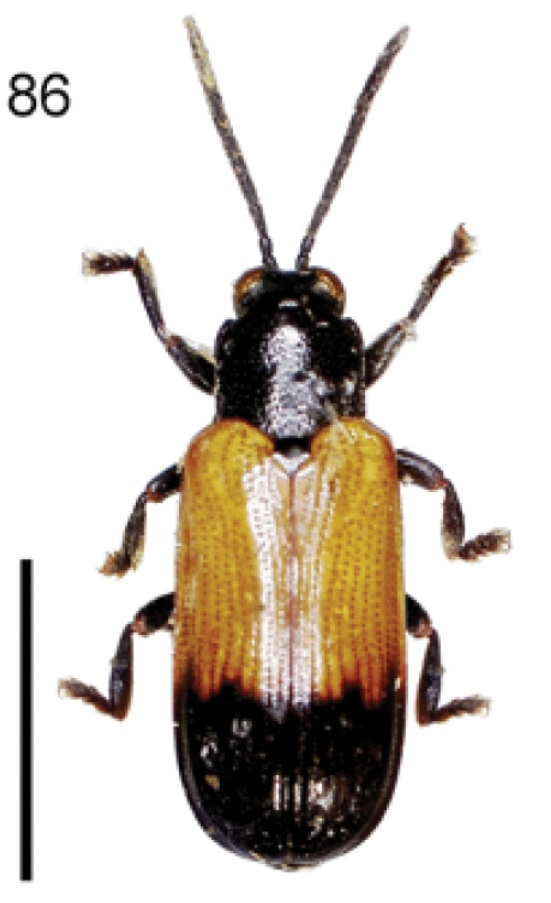

Scientific classification
- Kingdom: Animalia
- Phylum: Arthropoda
- Class: Insecta
- Order: Coleoptera
- Suborder: Polyphaga
- Infraorder: Cucujiformia
- Family: Chrysomelidae
- Genus: Cephaloleia
- Species: C. bicolor

Binomial name
- Cephaloleia bicolor Uhmann, 1930

= Cephaloleia bicolor =

Species of beetle

Cephaloleia bicolor is a species of beetle of the family Chrysomelidae. It is found in Bolivia, Brazil (Matto Grosso), Colombia, Ecuador, Peru and Venezuela.

== Description ==
Adults reach a length of about 5.5–6 mm. Adults are black, with the basal half of the elytron and epipleuron yellowish-brown. The antennae are dark.
