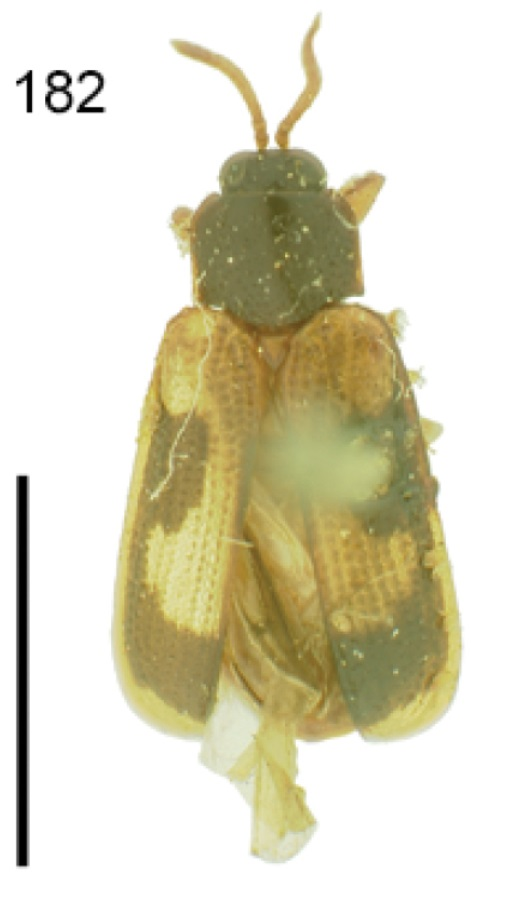

Scientific classification
- Kingdom: Animalia
- Phylum: Arthropoda
- Class: Insecta
- Order: Coleoptera
- Suborder: Polyphaga
- Infraorder: Cucujiformia
- Family: Chrysomelidae
- Genus: Cephaloleia
- Species: C. maculipennis

Binomial name
- Cephaloleia maculipennis Baly, 1858

= Cephaloleia maculipennis =

Species of beetle

Cephaloleia maculipennis is a species of beetle of the family Chrysomelidae. It is found in Brazil.

== Description ==
Adults reach a length of about 4.5 mm. The head is black, while the antennae are yellow with the apical two antennomeres darker. The pronotum is black with the lateral margin yellow. The elytron is yellow with a black curved transverse band near the apex and a black submarginal vitta starting at the base and ending in a black transverse band near the middle.
