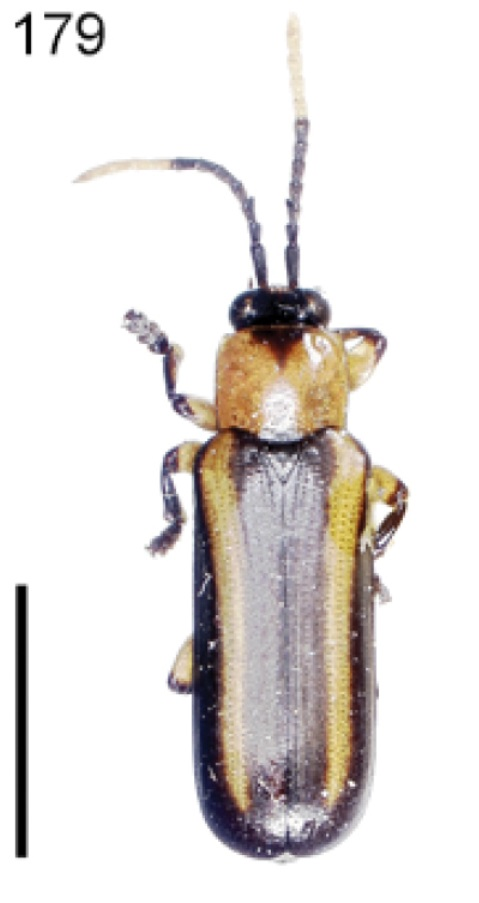

Scientific classification
- Kingdom: Animalia
- Phylum: Arthropoda
- Clade: Pancrustacea
- Class: Insecta
- Order: Coleoptera
- Suborder: Polyphaga
- Infraorder: Cucujiformia
- Family: Chrysomelidae
- Genus: Cephaloleia
- Species: C. luctuosa

Binomial name
- Cephaloleia luctuosa Guérin-Méneville, 1844

= Cephaloleia luctuosa =

Species of beetle

Cephaloleia luctuosa is a species of beetle of the family Chrysomelidae. It is found in Colombia and Panama.

== Description ==
Adults reach a length of about 6–7 mm. The head and scutellum are black. The antennae are either entirely black or antennomeres 8–11 are yellow. The pronotum is reddish-yellow with black quadrangular macula medially of the anterior margin extending towards the base. The elytron is black with a yellow vitta.
