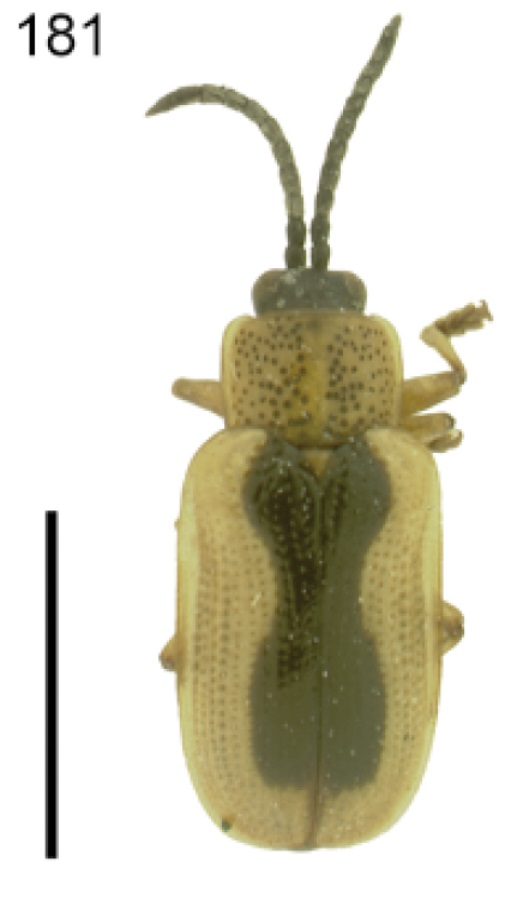

Scientific classification
- Kingdom: Animalia
- Phylum: Arthropoda
- Class: Insecta
- Order: Coleoptera
- Suborder: Polyphaga
- Infraorder: Cucujiformia
- Family: Chrysomelidae
- Genus: Cephaloleia
- Species: C. lydiae

Binomial name
- Cephaloleia lydiae Uhmann, 1954

= Cephaloleia lydiae =

Species of beetle

Cephaloleia lydiae is a species of beetle of the family Chrysomelidae. It is found in Brazil (Bahia).

== Description ==
Adults reach a length of about 5.5 mm. Adults are yellowish-brown, with the head and antennae black. The elytron has variable black markings.
