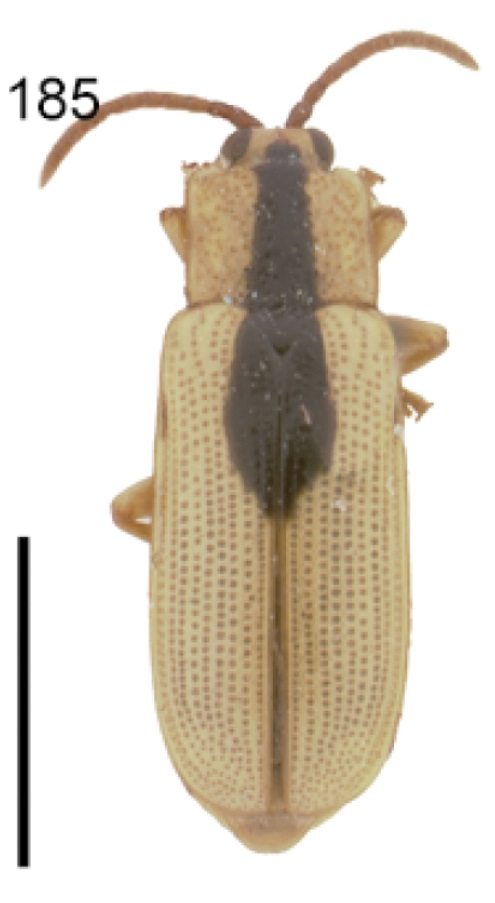

Scientific classification
- Kingdom: Animalia
- Phylum: Arthropoda
- Class: Insecta
- Order: Coleoptera
- Suborder: Polyphaga
- Infraorder: Cucujiformia
- Family: Chrysomelidae
- Genus: Cephaloleia
- Species: C. marshalli

Binomial name
- Cephaloleia marshalli Uhmann, 1938

= Cephaloleia marshalli =

Species of beetle

Cephaloleia marshalli is a species of beetle of the family Chrysomelidae. It is found in Ecuador.

== Description ==
Adults reach a length of about 6.4–6.7 mm. Adults are yellow, while the antennae are yellowish brown. The pronotum has a black broad longitudinal band and the basal one-third of the elytron has a black oval macula.
