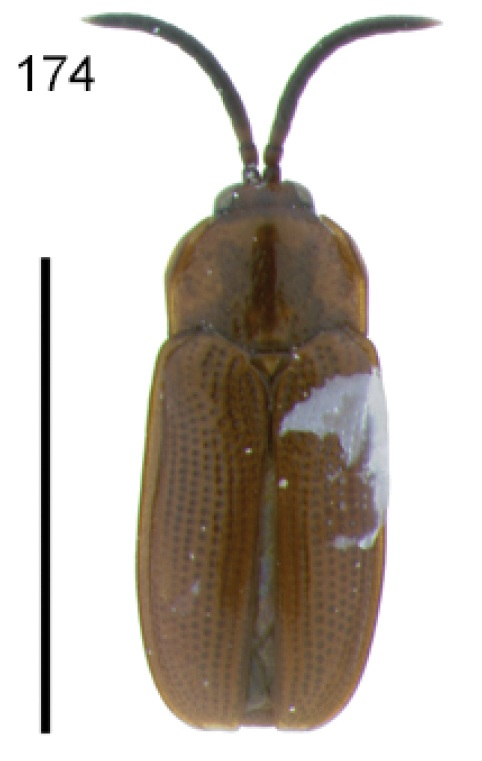

Scientific classification
- Kingdom: Animalia
- Phylum: Arthropoda
- Class: Insecta
- Order: Coleoptera
- Suborder: Polyphaga
- Infraorder: Cucujiformia
- Family: Chrysomelidae
- Genus: Cephaloleia
- Species: C. lenticula

Binomial name
- Cephaloleia lenticula Staines, 2014

= Cephaloleia lenticula =

Species of beetle

Cephaloleia lenticula is a species of beetle of the family Chrysomelidae. It is found in Ecuador, French Guiana, Peru and Suriname.

== Description ==
Adults reach a length of about 3.9 mm. Adults are castaneous, with antennomeres 4–10 darker and 11 dark basally and pale apically.

== Etymology ==
The species name is derived from Latin lenticula (meaning lens) and refers to the lens-shaped swelling on the lateral margin of the pronotum.
