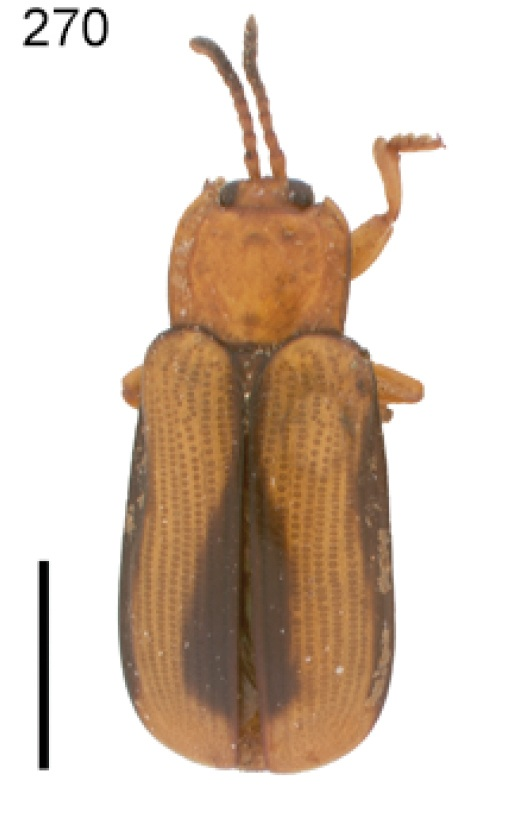

Scientific classification
- Kingdom: Animalia
- Phylum: Arthropoda
- Class: Insecta
- Order: Coleoptera
- Suborder: Polyphaga
- Infraorder: Cucujiformia
- Family: Chrysomelidae
- Genus: Cephaloleia
- Species: C. whitei

Binomial name
- Cephaloleia whitei Baly, 1858

= Cephaloleia whitei =

Species of beetle

Cephaloleia whitei is a species of beetle of the family Chrysomelidae. It is found in Colombia.

== Description ==
Adults reach a length of about 9 mm. Adults are reddish-yellow, with the eyes and antennomeres 7–11 dark. The elytron has the suture and lateral vittae dark.
