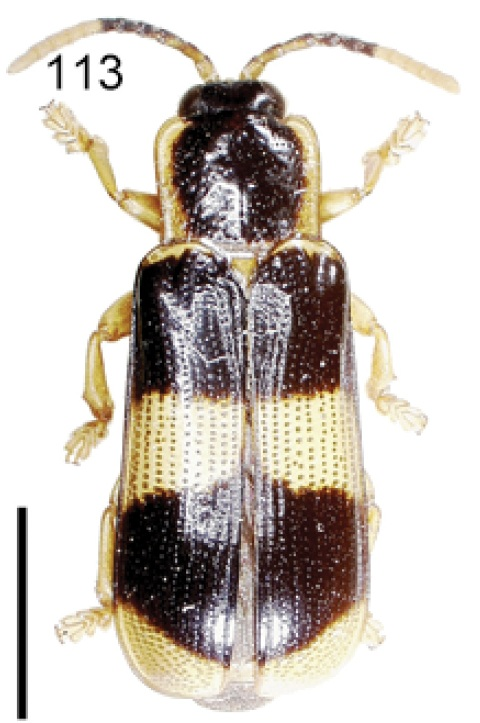

Scientific classification
- Kingdom: Animalia
- Phylum: Arthropoda
- Class: Insecta
- Order: Coleoptera
- Suborder: Polyphaga
- Infraorder: Cucujiformia
- Family: Chrysomelidae
- Genus: Cephaloleia
- Species: C. degandei

Binomial name
- Cephaloleia degandei Baly, 1858

= Cephaloleia degandei =

Species of beetle

Cephaloleia degandei is a species of beetle of the family Chrysomelidae. It is found in Ecuador and Peru.

== Description ==
Adults reach a length of about 8.8–9.2 mm. The dorsum is black and the venter is pale yellow. The vertex of the head is black and the frons yellowish. Antennomeres 1–3 are yellowish, 4–6 are black and 7–11 are whitish. The lateral margins of the pronotum, scutellum and the base of the elytron have a broad yellowish band, while the middle and apex of the elytron has a broad yellowish band. The legs are pale yellow.
