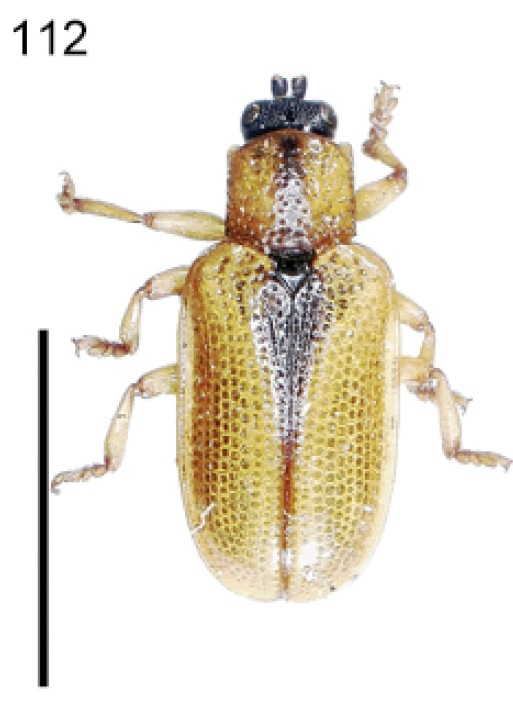

Scientific classification
- Kingdom: Animalia
- Phylum: Arthropoda
- Class: Insecta
- Order: Coleoptera
- Suborder: Polyphaga
- Infraorder: Cucujiformia
- Family: Chrysomelidae
- Genus: Cephaloleia
- Species: C. deficiens

Binomial name
- Cephaloleia deficiens Uhmann, 1930

= Cephaloleia deficiens =

Species of beetle

Cephaloleia deficiens is a species of beetle of the family Chrysomelidae. It is found in Costa Rica.

== Description ==
Adults reach a length of about 4.3–4.7 mm. Adults are yellowish-brown, with the antennae, head and mouthparts black. There is a black vitta on the pronotum and elytron. The elytron also has a black orbicular macula on the suture around the scutellum.

== Biology ==
Adults have been collected on Costus bracteatus and Cephaloleia malortieanus.
