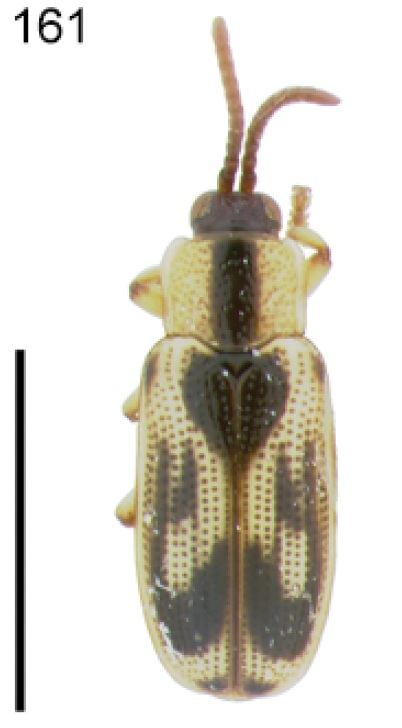

Scientific classification
- Kingdom: Animalia
- Phylum: Arthropoda
- Class: Insecta
- Order: Coleoptera
- Suborder: Polyphaga
- Infraorder: Cucujiformia
- Family: Chrysomelidae
- Genus: Cephaloleia
- Species: C. horvitzae

Binomial name
- Cephaloleia horvitzae Staines, 2014

= Cephaloleia horvitzae =

Species of beetle

Cephaloleia horvitzae is a species of beetle of the family Chrysomelidae. It is found in French Guiana.

== Description ==
Adults reach a length of about 4.2–4.7 mm. The head and antennae are yellowish-brown, while the pronotum is pale yellow with a broad black longitudinal vitta. The elytron is pale yellow with a black cordate macula at the base along the suture, a small black macula at the humerus, a black W-shaped vitta on the apical half and a black macula on the apex near the sutural angle. The legs are pale yellow.

== Etymology ==
The species is named for Carol C. Horvitz in recognition of her many contributions to the understanding of the ecology and evolution of Zingiberales and their interactions with pollinators, seed dispersers, and insect herbivores.
