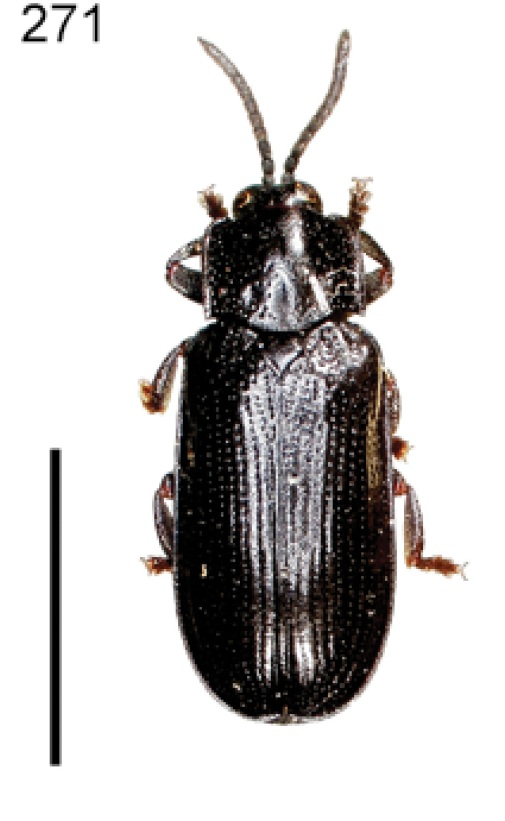

Scientific classification
- Kingdom: Animalia
- Phylum: Arthropoda
- Class: Insecta
- Order: Coleoptera
- Suborder: Polyphaga
- Infraorder: Cucujiformia
- Family: Chrysomelidae
- Genus: Cephaloleia
- Species: C. zikani

Binomial name
- Cephaloleia zikani Uhmann, 1935

= Cephaloleia zikani =

Species of beetle

Cephaloleia zikani is a species of beetle of the family Chrysomelidae. It is found in Brazil (Rio de Janeiro, Santa Catharina).

== Description ==
Adults reach a length of about 4.9–5.3 mm. Adults are shining black.
