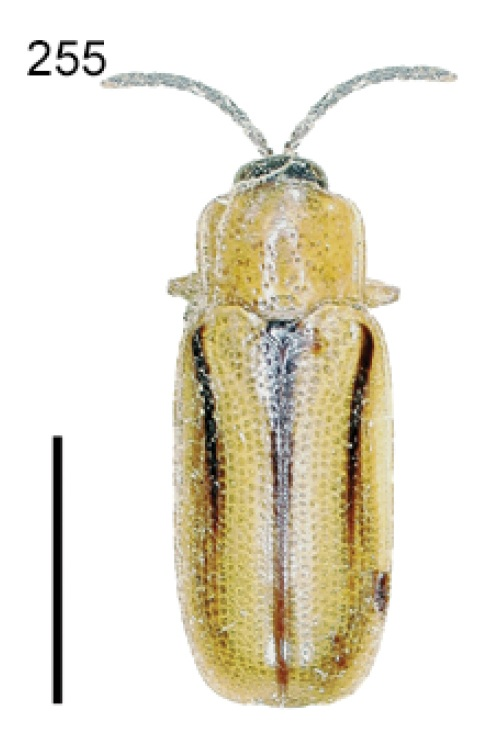

Scientific classification
- Kingdom: Animalia
- Phylum: Arthropoda
- Class: Insecta
- Order: Coleoptera
- Suborder: Polyphaga
- Infraorder: Cucujiformia
- Family: Chrysomelidae
- Genus: Cephaloleia
- Species: C. trilineata

Binomial name
- Cephaloleia trilineata Uhmann, 1942

= Cephaloleia trilineata =

Species of beetle

Cephaloleia trilineata is a species of beetle of the family Chrysomelidae. It is found in Argentina and Brazil (Río de Janeiro).

== Description ==
Adults reach a length of about 6–6.2 mm. Adults are yellowish-brown, with antennomeres 1–2 reddish-brown and 3–11 black. The head has the vertex black and the scutellum is also black. The elytron has a black sutural vitta, a black vitta from the humerus to near the apex, and a black apex.
