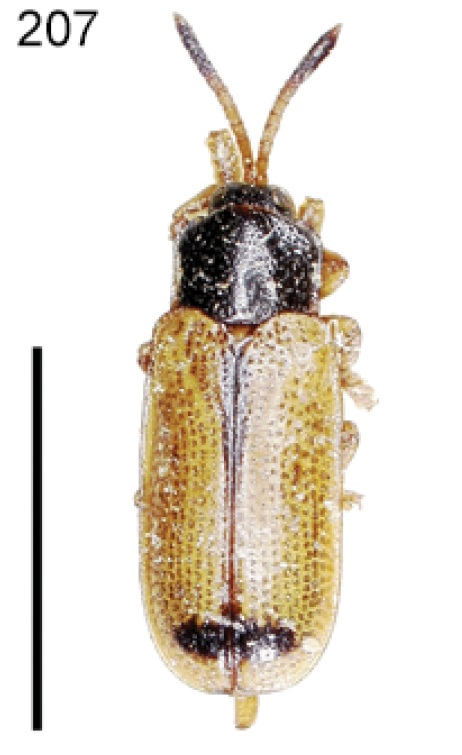

Scientific classification
- Kingdom: Animalia
- Phylum: Arthropoda
- Class: Insecta
- Order: Coleoptera
- Suborder: Polyphaga
- Infraorder: Cucujiformia
- Family: Chrysomelidae
- Genus: Cephaloleia
- Species: C. parvula

Binomial name
- Cephaloleia parvula Weise, 1910

= Cephaloleia parvula =

Species of beetle

Cephaloleia parvula is a species of beetle of the family Chrysomelidae. It is found in Bolivia and Brazil (Goiás, Río Grande do Sul).

== Description ==
Adults reach a length of about 3.9–4.1 mm. The head is black and antennomeres 1–7 are reddish, while 8–11 are darker. The pronotum is black with paler anterior and lateral margins. The elytron is reddish-yellow with a black longitudinal vitta on the basal half along the suture and a black dilated macula apically.

== Biology ==
Adults have been collected on Carex species.
