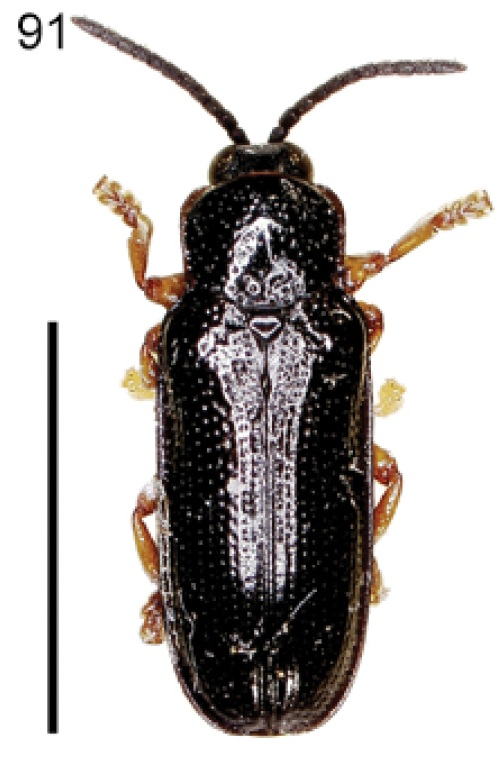

Scientific classification
- Kingdom: Animalia
- Phylum: Arthropoda
- Clade: Pancrustacea
- Class: Insecta
- Order: Coleoptera
- Suborder: Polyphaga
- Infraorder: Cucujiformia
- Family: Chrysomelidae
- Genus: Cephaloleia
- Species: C. bucki

Binomial name
- Cephaloleia bucki Uhmann, 1957

= Cephaloleia bucki =

Species of beetle

Cephaloleia bucki is a species of beetle of the family Chrysomelidae. It is found in Brazil (Rio Grande do Sul).

== Description ==
Adults reach a length of about 3.9–4 mm. Adults are brownish-yellow with a black head. The pronotum is black with a brownish-yellow lateral margin.

== Biology ==
They have been recorded feeding on Carex species.
