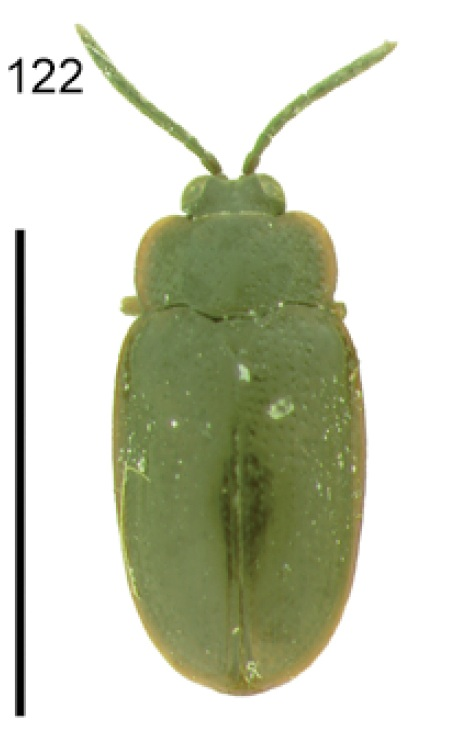

Scientific classification
- Kingdom: Animalia
- Phylum: Arthropoda
- Class: Insecta
- Order: Coleoptera
- Suborder: Polyphaga
- Infraorder: Cucujiformia
- Family: Chrysomelidae
- Genus: Cephaloleia
- Species: C. diplothemium

Binomial name
- Cephaloleia diplothemium Uhmann, 1951

= Cephaloleia diplothemium =

Species of beetle

Cephaloleia diplothemium is a species of beetle of the family Chrysomelidae. It is found in Brazil (Bahia, Goiás, Matto Grosso, Minas Gerais).

== Description ==
Adults reach a length of about 3–3.5 mm. The head and pronotum are black with a weak metallic sheen, while the elytron is metallic-green. The mouthparts and antennae are brownish and the legs and sides of the abdomen are pitch-brown.

== Biology ==
The recorded host plant is Diplothemium caudescens.
