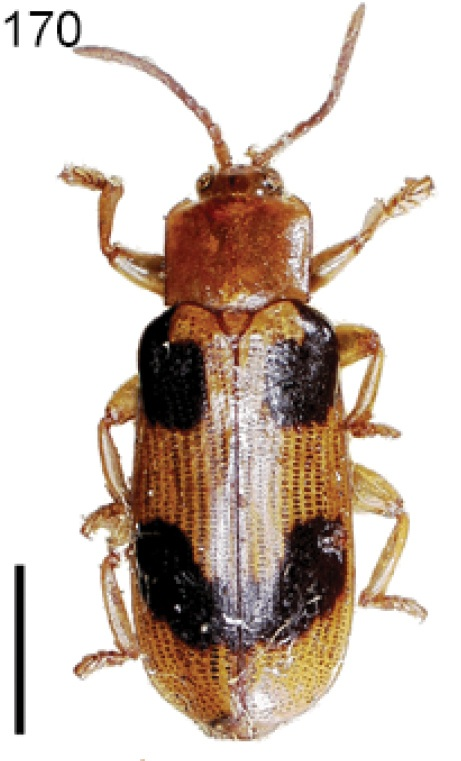

Scientific classification
- Kingdom: Animalia
- Phylum: Arthropoda
- Class: Insecta
- Order: Coleoptera
- Suborder: Polyphaga
- Infraorder: Cucujiformia
- Family: Chrysomelidae
- Genus: Cephaloleia
- Species: C. kolbei

Binomial name
- Cephaloleia kolbei Weise, 1910

= Cephaloleia kolbei =

Species of beetle

Cephaloleia kolbei is a species of beetle of the family Chrysomelidae. It is restricted to the Pacific versant of the Cordillera Occidental in Colombia. Records from other locations (such as Bolivia, Brazil (Bahia), Ecuador and Peru) are based on misidentifications.

== Description ==
Adults reach a length of about 9.7–10.2 mm. Adults are reddish, the elytron with a dark macula near the scutellum, a second at the humerus and a third near the apex.
