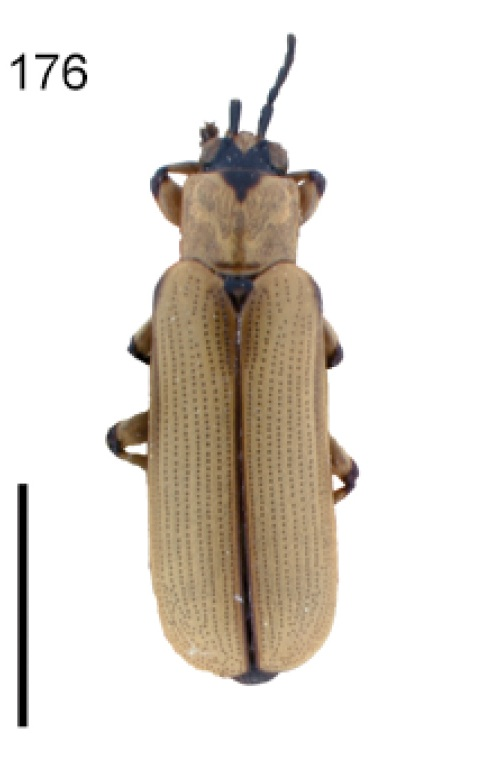

Scientific classification
- Kingdom: Animalia
- Phylum: Arthropoda
- Class: Insecta
- Order: Coleoptera
- Suborder: Polyphaga
- Infraorder: Cucujiformia
- Family: Chrysomelidae
- Genus: Cephaloleia
- Species: C. leucoxantha

Binomial name
- Cephaloleia leucoxantha Baly, 1885

= Cephaloleia leucoxantha =

Species of beetle

Cephaloleia leucoxantha is a species of beetle of the family Chrysomelidae. It is found in Panama.

== Description ==
Adults reach a length of about 6.7 mm. The head, antennae and scutellum are black, while the pronotum is yellowish with a black triangular medial macula on the anterior margin. The elytron is yellowish, with the suture darker and a black macula at the humerus.
