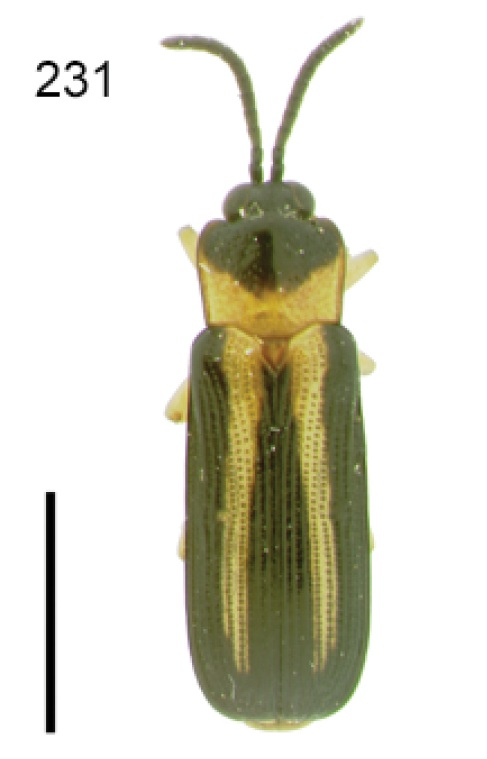

Scientific classification
- Kingdom: Animalia
- Phylum: Arthropoda
- Class: Insecta
- Order: Coleoptera
- Suborder: Polyphaga
- Infraorder: Cucujiformia
- Family: Chrysomelidae
- Genus: Cephaloleia
- Species: C. saundersii

Binomial name
- Cephaloleia saundersii Baly, 1858

= Cephaloleia saundersii =

Species of beetle

Cephaloleia saundersii is a species of beetle of the family Chrysomelidae. It is found in Brazil, Ecuador and Peru.

== Description ==
Adults reach a length of about 6.5–7 mm. Adults are black, while the basal one-third of the pronotum and a longitudinal vitta on the elytron are yellowish. The scutellum, venter and legs are yellowish.
