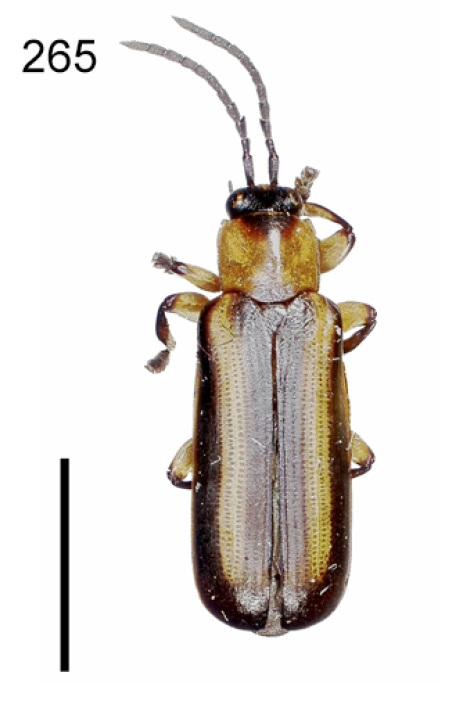

Scientific classification
- Kingdom: Animalia
- Phylum: Arthropoda
- Class: Insecta
- Order: Coleoptera
- Suborder: Polyphaga
- Infraorder: Cucujiformia
- Family: Chrysomelidae
- Genus: Cephaloleia
- Species: C. variabilis

Binomial name
- Cephaloleia variabilis Staines, 1996

= Cephaloleia variabilis =

Species of beetle

Cephaloleia variabilis is a species of beetle of the family Chrysomelidae. It is found in Colombia and Panama.

== Description ==
Adults reach a length of about 6.3–7.1 mm. The head and scutellum are black. The antennae are wholly black or antennomeres 9–11 are yellow. The pronotum is yellowish with black maculae on the anterior and basal the margins connected by a narrow black vitta. The elytron is brown or black with a yellow longitudinal vitta from the base to the apical one-fourth. The lateral margin is black or yellow.
