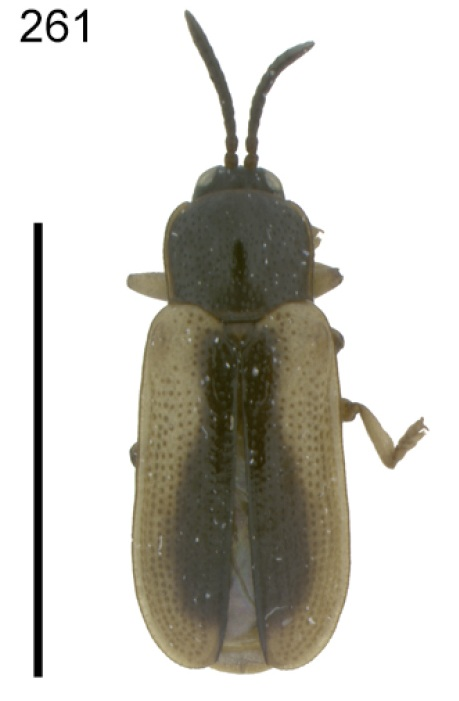

Scientific classification
- Kingdom: Animalia
- Phylum: Arthropoda
- Class: Insecta
- Order: Coleoptera
- Suborder: Polyphaga
- Infraorder: Cucujiformia
- Family: Chrysomelidae
- Genus: Cephaloleia
- Species: C. uhmanni

Binomial name
- Cephaloleia uhmanni Staines, 1996

= Cephaloleia uhmanni =

Species of beetle

Cephaloleia uhmanni is a species of rolled-leaf beetle in the family Chrysomelidae. It is found in Costa Rica, Nicaragua and Panama.

== Description ==
Adults reach a length of about 3.3–3.9 mm. Adults are variable in colouration. The head is black and antennomeres 1–3 are reddish-yellow, while 4–11 are black. The pronotum is black with paler margins and the scutellum is black. The elytron is black with reddish yellow at the humerus and margins or brownish with a dark suture.
