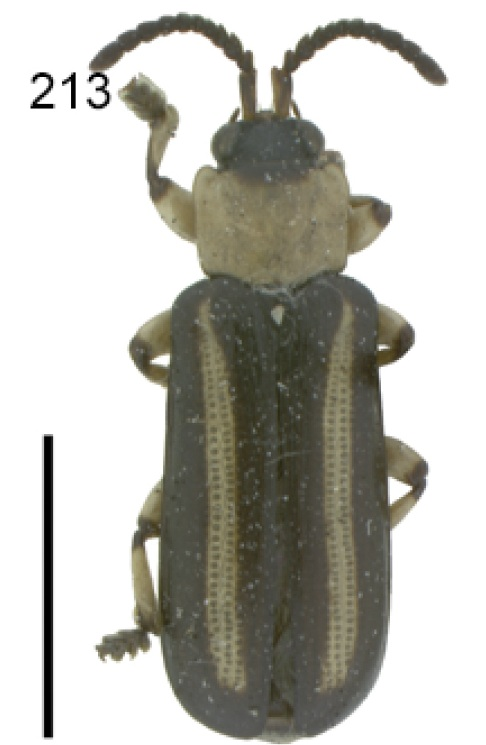

Scientific classification
- Kingdom: Animalia
- Phylum: Arthropoda
- Class: Insecta
- Order: Coleoptera
- Suborder: Polyphaga
- Infraorder: Cucujiformia
- Family: Chrysomelidae
- Genus: Cephaloleia
- Species: C. presignis

Binomial name
- Cephaloleia presignis Staines, 1996

= Cephaloleia presignis =

Species of beetle

Cephaloleia presignis is a species of rolled-leaf beetle in the family Chrysomelidae. It is found in Mexico.

== Description ==
Adults reach a length of about 6.4 mm. The head, antennae (except for the yellow basal antennomere) and scutellum are black and the pronotum is yellowish with a dark medial longitudinal macula on the anterior margin. The elytron is black with a yellow vitta.
