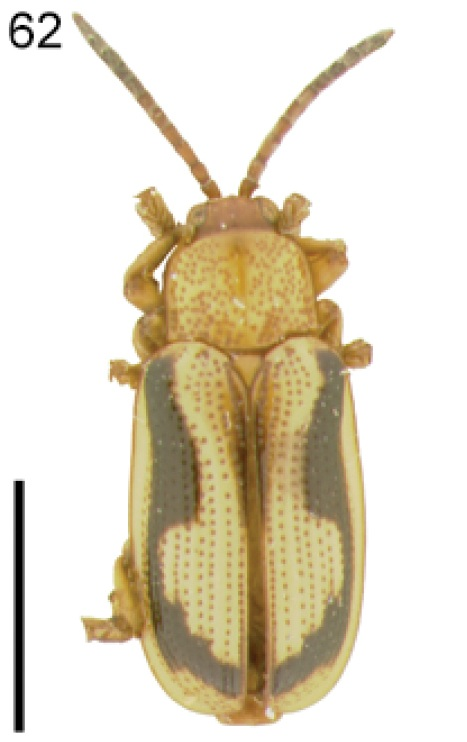

Scientific classification
- Kingdom: Animalia
- Phylum: Arthropoda
- Class: Insecta
- Order: Coleoptera
- Suborder: Polyphaga
- Infraorder: Cucujiformia
- Family: Chrysomelidae
- Genus: Cephaloleia
- Species: C. abdita

Binomial name
- Cephaloleia abdita Staines, 2014

= Cephaloleia abdita =

Species of beetle

Cephaloleia abdita is a species of beetle of the family Chrysomelidae. It is found in Brazil (São Paulo).

== Description ==
Adults reach a length of about 6.2 mm. Adults are yellowish, the elytra with a black vitta of variable width from the humerus along the edges of lateral and apical margins. The suture is dark.

== Etymology ==
Abdita (Latin) meaning forgotten since this species has been overlooked since being collected in 1899.
