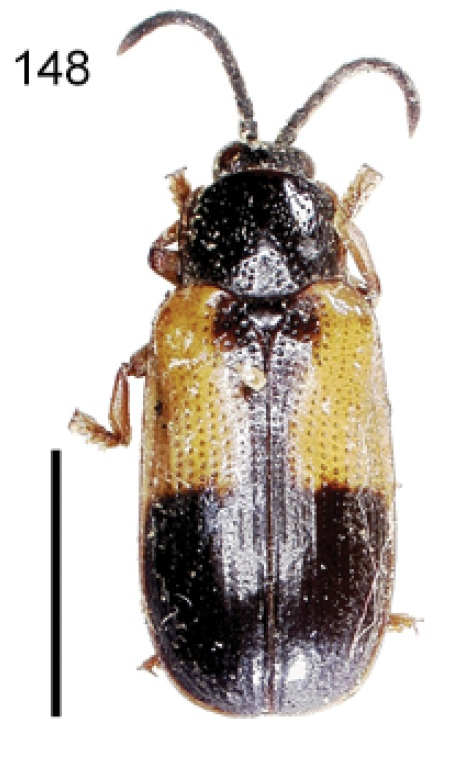

Scientific classification
- Kingdom: Animalia
- Phylum: Arthropoda
- Class: Insecta
- Order: Coleoptera
- Suborder: Polyphaga
- Infraorder: Cucujiformia
- Family: Chrysomelidae
- Genus: Cephaloleia
- Species: C. fulvipes

Binomial name
- Cephaloleia fulvipes Baly, 1858

= Cephaloleia fulvipes =

Species of beetle

Cephaloleia fulvipes is a species of beetle in the family Chrysomelidae. It is found in Brazil (São Paulo) and Ecuador.

== Description ==
Adults reach a length of about 6–6.4 mm. The head, antennae, pronotum (except for paler lateral margins) and scutellum are shining black. The elytron is yellow with the apical half black and with the suture darkened at the base.
