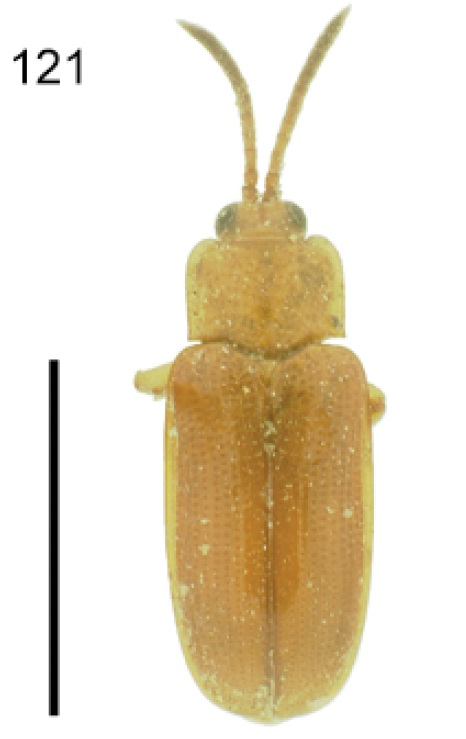

Scientific classification
- Kingdom: Animalia
- Phylum: Arthropoda
- Class: Insecta
- Order: Coleoptera
- Suborder: Polyphaga
- Infraorder: Cucujiformia
- Family: Chrysomelidae
- Genus: Cephaloleia
- Species: C. dimidiaticornis

Binomial name
- Cephaloleia dimidiaticornis Baly, 1869

= Cephaloleia dimidiaticornis =

Species of beetle

Cephaloleia dimidiaticornis is a species of beetle of the family Chrysomelidae. It is found in Brazil (São Paulo) and Peru.

== Description ==
Adults reach a length of about 4–4.9 mm. Adults are reddish-brown, with the eyes and antennomeres 7–11 darker.

== Biology ==
Adults have been collected on an unidentified palm (Arecaceae) species.
