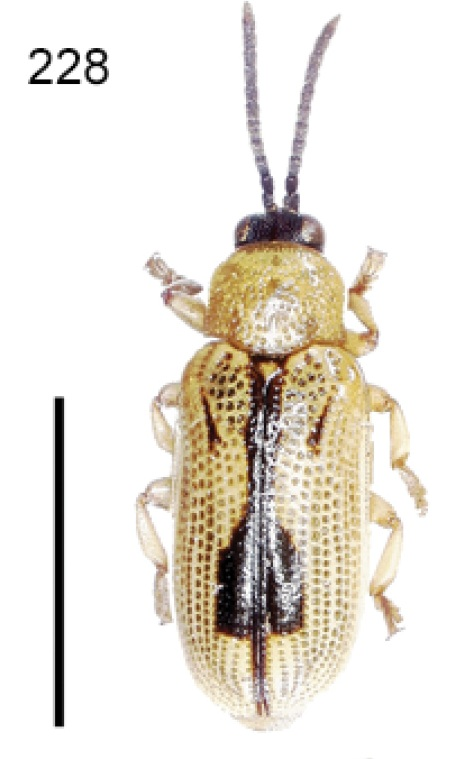

Scientific classification
- Kingdom: Animalia
- Phylum: Arthropoda
- Class: Insecta
- Order: Coleoptera
- Suborder: Polyphaga
- Infraorder: Cucujiformia
- Family: Chrysomelidae
- Genus: Cephaloleia
- Species: C. sagittifera

Binomial name
- Cephaloleia sagittifera Uhmann, 1939

= Cephaloleia sagittifera =

Species of beetle

Cephaloleia sagittifera is a species of beetle of the family Chrysomelidae. It is found in Argentina and Brazil (Santa Catharina).

== Description ==
Adults reach a length of about 4.5–5 mm. Adults are yellowish-brown, with the head and antennae (except antennomere 1 which is brownish) black. The elytron has a black sutural marking.
