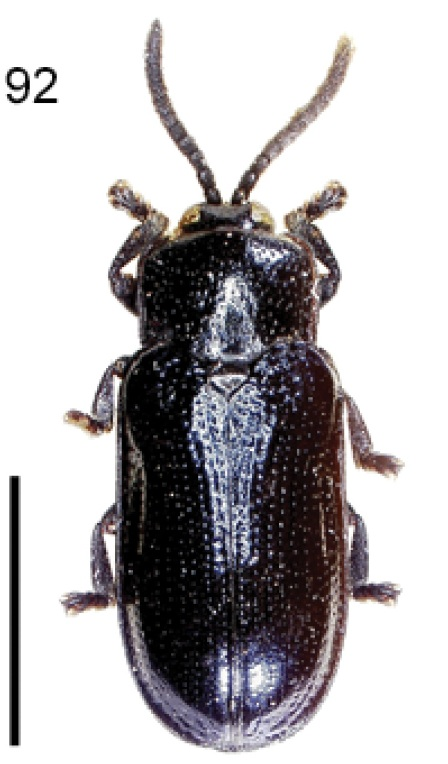

Scientific classification
- Kingdom: Animalia
- Phylum: Arthropoda
- Class: Insecta
- Order: Coleoptera
- Suborder: Polyphaga
- Infraorder: Cucujiformia
- Family: Chrysomelidae
- Genus: Cephaloleia
- Species: C. caeruleata

Binomial name
- Cephaloleia caeruleata Baly, 1875

Synonyms
- Cephaloleia dilatata Uhmann, 1948

= Cephaloleia caeruleata =

Species of beetle

Cephaloleia caeruleata is a species of beetle of the family Chrysomelidae. It is found in Brazil (Minas Gerais, Río de Janeiro, Santa Catharina) and Ecuador.

== Description ==
Adults reach a length of about 5.2–6.1 mm. The head, antennae, pronotum and legs are black, while the elytron is metallic blue.
