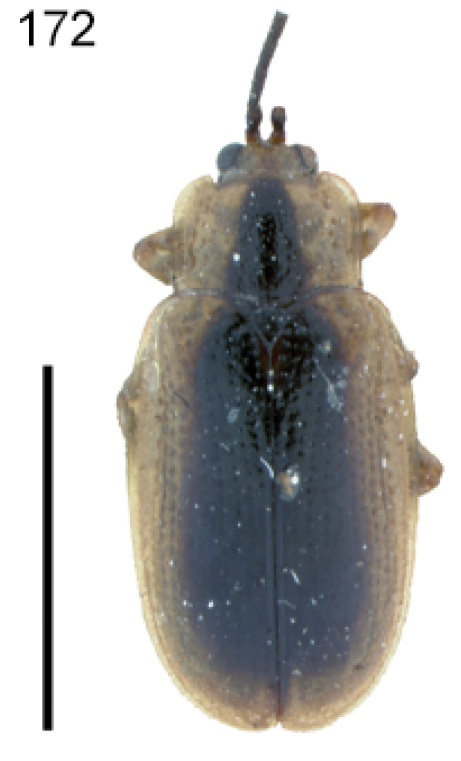

Scientific classification
- Kingdom: Animalia
- Phylum: Arthropoda
- Class: Insecta
- Order: Coleoptera
- Suborder: Polyphaga
- Infraorder: Cucujiformia
- Family: Chrysomelidae
- Genus: Cephaloleia
- Species: C. lateralis

Binomial name
- Cephaloleia lateralis Baly, 1885

= Cephaloleia lateralis =

Species of beetle

Cephaloleia lateralis is a species of beetle of the family Chrysomelidae. It is found in Guatemala.

== Description ==
Adults reach a length of about 4.8 mm. Adults are yellowish, with antennomeres 2–11 darker. The pronotum has a medial black wedge-shaped macula and the scutellum is dark brown. The elytron is dark brownish medially.
