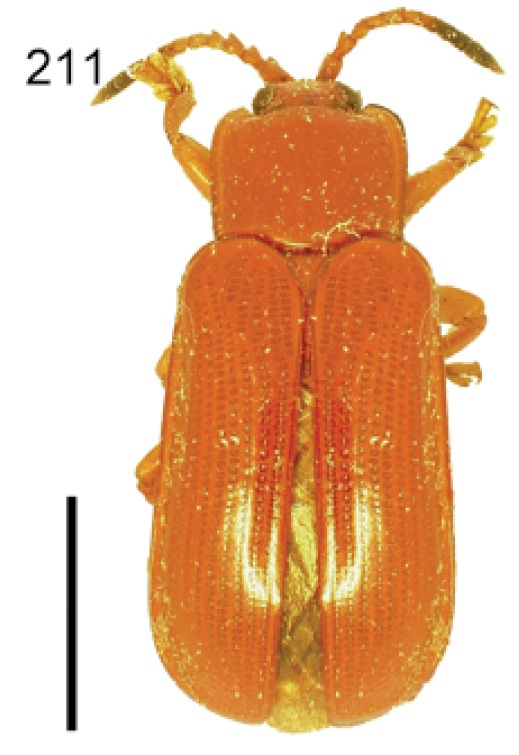

Scientific classification
- Kingdom: Animalia
- Phylum: Arthropoda
- Class: Insecta
- Order: Coleoptera
- Suborder: Polyphaga
- Infraorder: Cucujiformia
- Family: Chrysomelidae
- Genus: Cephaloleia
- Species: C. polita

Binomial name
- Cephaloleia polita Weise, 1910

= Cephaloleia polita =

Species of beetle

Cephaloleia polita is a species of beetle of the family Chrysomelidae. It is found in Colombia.

== Description ==
Adults reach a length of about 8.3–8.8 mm. Adults are reddish, with antennomeres 1–3 yellowish-brown and 4–11 darker.
