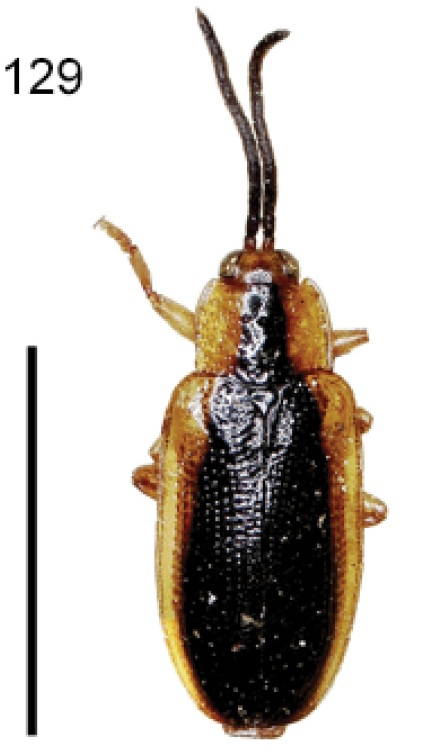

Scientific classification
- Kingdom: Animalia
- Phylum: Arthropoda
- Class: Insecta
- Order: Coleoptera
- Suborder: Polyphaga
- Infraorder: Cucujiformia
- Family: Chrysomelidae
- Genus: Cephaloleia
- Species: C. elegantula

Binomial name
- Cephaloleia elegantula Baly, 1885

= Cephaloleia elegantula =

Species of beetle

Cephaloleia elegantula is a species of beetle of the family Chrysomelidae. It is found in Costa Rica, Panama and possibly Brazil.

== Description ==
Adults reach a length of about 3.7–4.2 mm. The antennae (except antennomere 1 which is black), head and legs are yellow, while the pronotum is reddish-yellow with a black central macula. The elytron is yellow with a black medial vitta.

== Biology ==
Adults have been collected in palm frond (Arecaceae).
