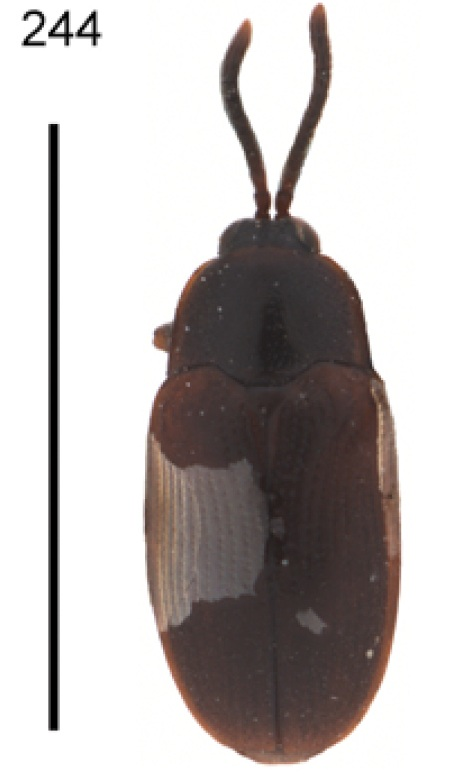

Scientific classification
- Kingdom: Animalia
- Phylum: Arthropoda
- Class: Insecta
- Order: Coleoptera
- Suborder: Polyphaga
- Infraorder: Cucujiformia
- Family: Chrysomelidae
- Genus: Cephaloleia
- Species: C. subdepressa

Binomial name
- Cephaloleia subdepressa Baly, 1878

= Cephaloleia subdepressa =

Species of beetle

Cephaloleia subdepressa is a species of beetle of the family Chrysomelidae. It is found in Brazil (Minas Gerais).

== Description ==
Adults reach a length of about 2.5–2.8 mm. Adults are reddish-brown with the margins of the pronotum and elytron paler. The head and antennae are dark, except for the basal antennomeres.
