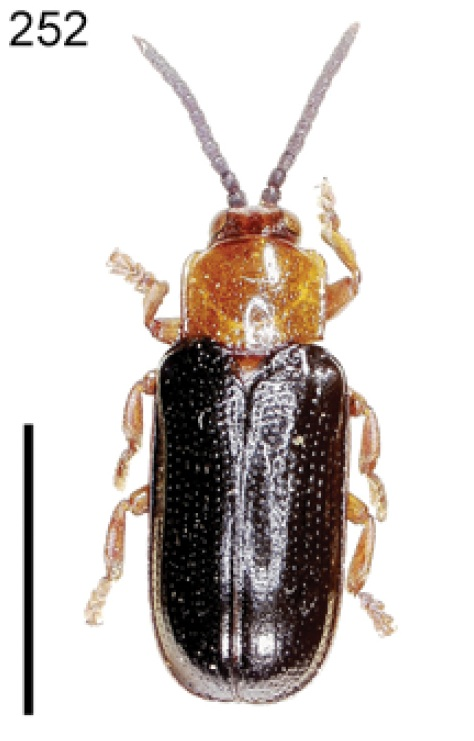

Scientific classification
- Kingdom: Animalia
- Phylum: Arthropoda
- Class: Insecta
- Order: Coleoptera
- Suborder: Polyphaga
- Infraorder: Cucujiformia
- Family: Chrysomelidae
- Genus: Cephaloleia
- Species: C. teutonica

Binomial name
- Cephaloleia teutonica Uhmann, 1937

= Cephaloleia teutonica =

Species of beetle

Cephaloleia teutonica is a species of beetle of the family Chrysomelidae. It is found in Argentina and Brazil (Minas Gerais, Río Grande do Sul, Santa Catharina, São Paulo).

== Description ==
Adults reach a length of about 5–5.5 mm. The head, pronotum, scutellum, venter and legs are yellowish-brown,, while the antennae and elytron are black.
