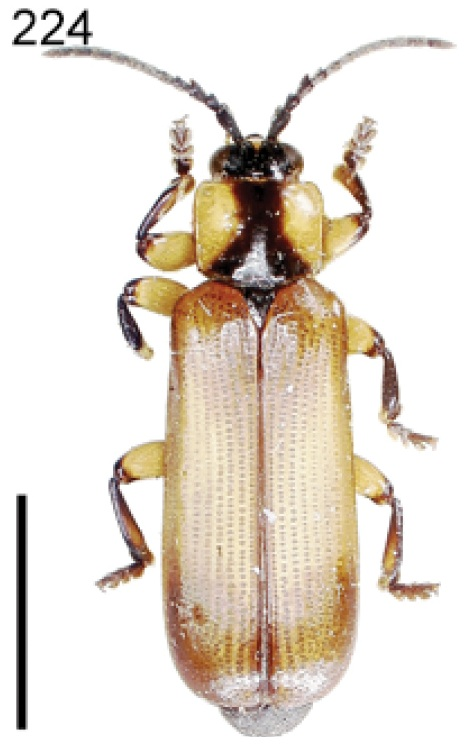

Scientific classification
- Kingdom: Animalia
- Phylum: Arthropoda
- Clade: Pancrustacea
- Class: Insecta
- Order: Coleoptera
- Suborder: Polyphaga
- Infraorder: Cucujiformia
- Family: Chrysomelidae
- Genus: Cephaloleia
- Species: C. rosenbergi

Binomial name
- Cephaloleia rosenbergi Weise, 1905

= Cephaloleia rosenbergi =

Species of beetle

Cephaloleia rosenbergi is a species of beetle of the family Chrysomelidae. It is found in Ecuador.

== Description ==
Adults reach a length of about 7.5–8 mm. Adults are yellowish with dark markings. The antennae, head, medial longitudinal pronotal vitta, scutellum, elytral base and apex are dark.
