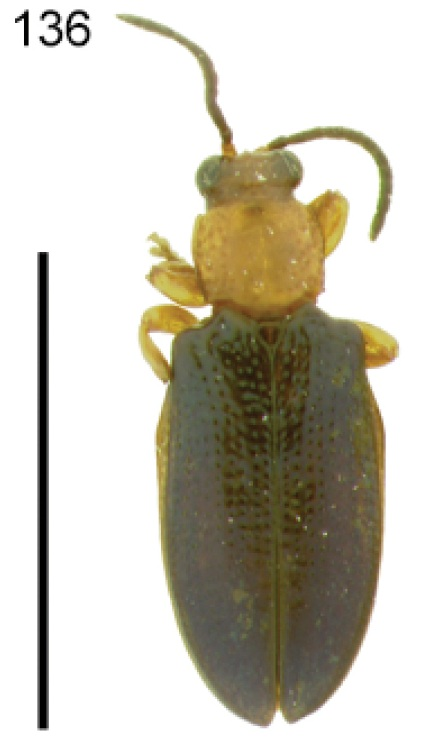

Scientific classification
- Kingdom: Animalia
- Phylum: Arthropoda
- Class: Insecta
- Order: Coleoptera
- Suborder: Polyphaga
- Infraorder: Cucujiformia
- Family: Chrysomelidae
- Genus: Cephaloleia
- Species: C. faceta

Binomial name
- Cephaloleia faceta Staines, 1996

= Cephaloleia faceta =

Species of beetle

Cephaloleia faceta is a species of rolled-leaf beetle in the family Chrysomelidae. It is found in Panama. The species name is sometimes misspelled as "facetus" (e.g.).

== Description ==
Adults reach a length of about 3.3–3.7 mm. The head, pronotum, venter and legs are reddish-brown, while the elytron, antennae and eyes are dark.

== Biology ==
Adults have been collected on unidentified palm (Arecaceae).
