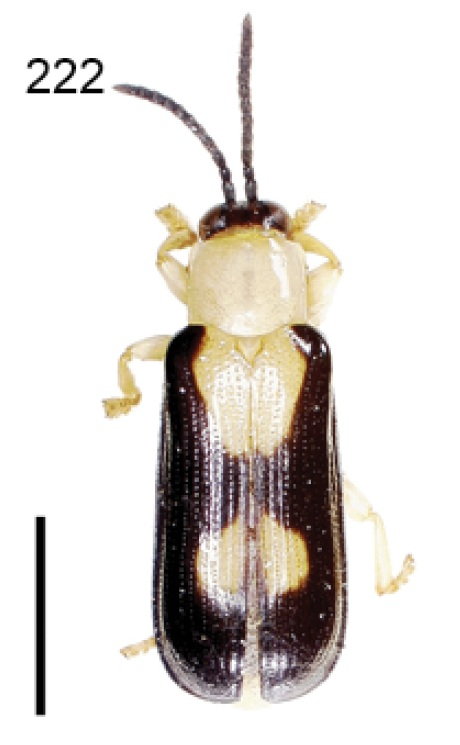

Scientific classification
- Kingdom: Animalia
- Phylum: Arthropoda
- Class: Insecta
- Order: Coleoptera
- Suborder: Polyphaga
- Infraorder: Cucujiformia
- Family: Chrysomelidae
- Genus: Cephaloleia
- Species: C. recondita

Binomial name
- Cephaloleia recondita Pic, 1923

= Cephaloleia recondita =

Species of beetle

Cephaloleia recondita is a species of beetle of the family Chrysomelidae. It is found in Colombia and Ecuador.

== Description ==
Adults reach a length of about 7.8–8.2 mm. The pronotum, scutellum, venter and legs are yellowish-brown, while the antennae, vertex of the head and mouthparts are black. The elytron is black with yellowish-brown maculae.
