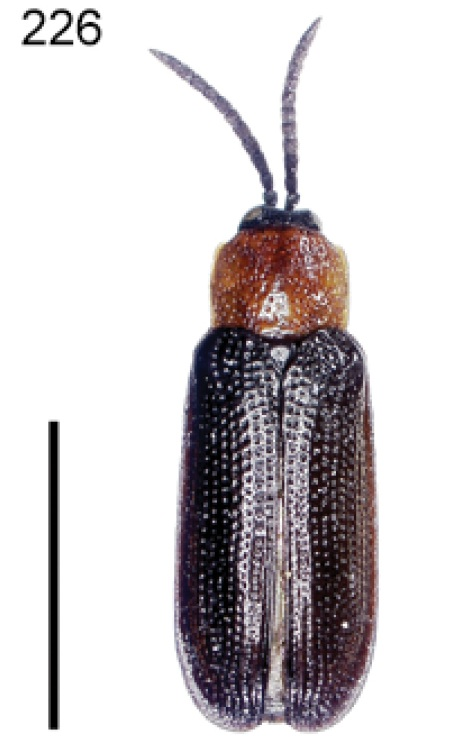

Scientific classification
- Kingdom: Animalia
- Phylum: Arthropoda
- Class: Insecta
- Order: Coleoptera
- Suborder: Polyphaga
- Infraorder: Cucujiformia
- Family: Chrysomelidae
- Genus: Cephaloleia
- Species: C. ruficollis

Binomial name
- Cephaloleia ruficollis Baly, 1858

= Cephaloleia ruficollis =

Species of beetle

Cephaloleia ruficollis is a species of beetle of the family Chrysomelidae. It is found in Belize, Costa Rica, El Salvador, Guatemala, Honduras, Mexico and Nicaragua.

== Description ==
Adults reach a length of about 5.1–5.3 mm. The head, antennae, elytron and venter are black, while the pronotum is red.
