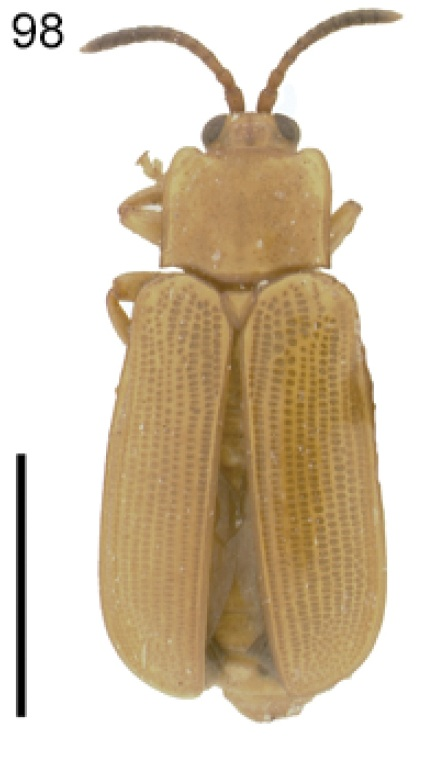

Scientific classification
- Kingdom: Animalia
- Phylum: Arthropoda
- Clade: Pancrustacea
- Class: Insecta
- Order: Coleoptera
- Suborder: Polyphaga
- Infraorder: Cucujiformia
- Family: Chrysomelidae
- Genus: Cephaloleia
- Species: C. chimboana

Binomial name
- Cephaloleia chimboana Uhmann, 1938

= Cephaloleia chimboana =

Species of beetle

Cephaloleia chimboana is a species of beetle of the family Chrysomelidae. It is found in Ecuador and Peru.

== Description ==
Adults reach a length of about 6.3–6.8 mm. Adults are pale yellowish brown, with the apical four or five antennomeres darkened and the apex of antennomere 11 pale. The elytral punctures are dark.
