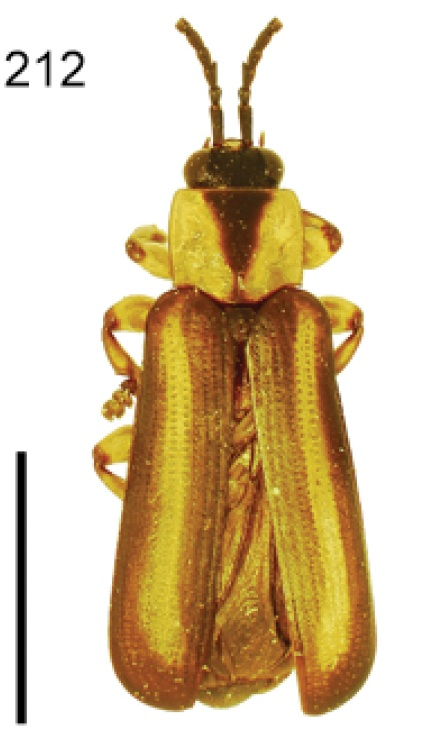

Scientific classification
- Kingdom: Animalia
- Phylum: Arthropoda
- Class: Insecta
- Order: Coleoptera
- Suborder: Polyphaga
- Infraorder: Cucujiformia
- Family: Chrysomelidae
- Genus: Cephaloleia
- Species: C. postuma

Binomial name
- Cephaloleia postuma Weise, 1905

= Cephaloleia postuma =

Species of beetle

Cephaloleia postuma is a species of beetle of the family Chrysomelidae. It is found in Mexico.

== Description ==
Adults reach a length of about 5.5–6 mm. The head, antennae and scutellum are black, while the pronotum is yellowish with a longitudinal black vitta. The elytron is black with a narrow yellow vitta between puncture rows 4 and 5 and the lateral margin is entirely black.
