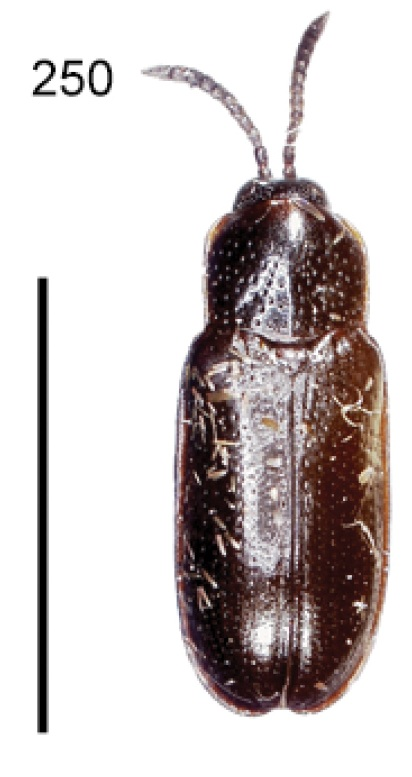

Scientific classification
- Kingdom: Animalia
- Phylum: Arthropoda
- Class: Insecta
- Order: Coleoptera
- Suborder: Polyphaga
- Infraorder: Cucujiformia
- Family: Chrysomelidae
- Genus: Cephaloleia
- Species: C. tenella

Binomial name
- Cephaloleia tenella Baly, 1885

= Cephaloleia tenella =

Species of beetle

Cephaloleia tenella is a species of beetle of the family Chrysomelidae. It is found in Costa Rica, El Salvador, Guatemala, Mexico, Nicaragua and Panama.

== Description ==
Adults reach a length of about 3.4–3.6 mm. Adults are black. The pronotum and elytron with paler margins.

== Biology ==
Adults have been collected on palm leaves (Arecaceae).
