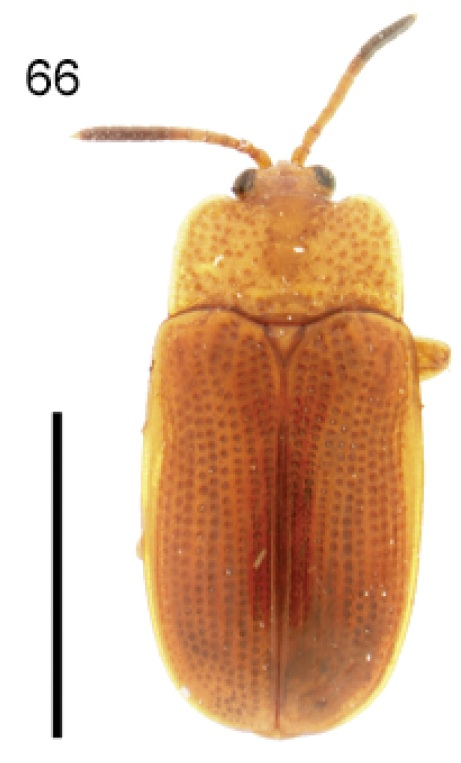

Scientific classification
- Kingdom: Animalia
- Phylum: Arthropoda
- Class: Insecta
- Order: Coleoptera
- Suborder: Polyphaga
- Infraorder: Cucujiformia
- Family: Chrysomelidae
- Genus: Cephaloleia
- Species: C. aequilata

Binomial name
- Cephaloleia aequilata Uhmann, 1930

= Cephaloleia aequilata =

Species of beetle

Cephaloleia aequilata is a species of beetle of the family Chrysomelidae. It is found in Costa Rica and Guatemala.

== Description ==
Adults reach a length of about 4.3–5.6 mm. They are reddish-brown.
