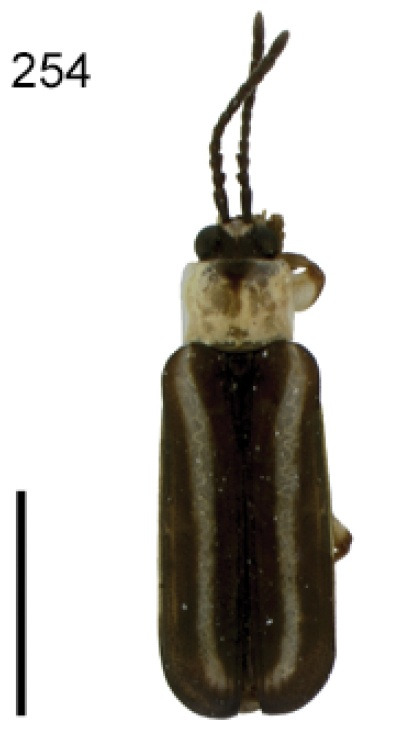

Scientific classification
- Kingdom: Animalia
- Phylum: Arthropoda
- Class: Insecta
- Order: Coleoptera
- Suborder: Polyphaga
- Infraorder: Cucujiformia
- Family: Chrysomelidae
- Genus: Cephaloleia
- Species: C. triangularis

Binomial name
- Cephaloleia triangularis Staines, 1996

= Cephaloleia triangularis =

Species of beetle

Cephaloleia triangularis is a species of rolled-leaf beetle in the family Chrysomelidae. It is found in Costa Rica.

== Description ==
Adults reach a length of about 5.7–7.1 mm. The head, antennae and scutellum are black, while the pronotum is reddish or yellowish with a black macula on the anterior margin behind the head which varies from semicircular to triangular in shape. The elytron is black with a yellow longitudinal vitta.
