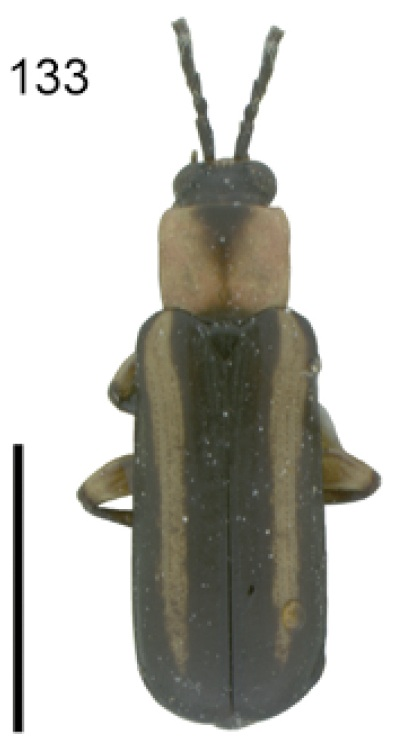

Scientific classification
- Kingdom: Animalia
- Phylum: Arthropoda
- Class: Insecta
- Order: Coleoptera
- Suborder: Polyphaga
- Infraorder: Cucujiformia
- Family: Chrysomelidae
- Genus: Cephaloleia
- Species: C. erugata

Binomial name
- Cephaloleia erugata Staines, 1996

= Cephaloleia erugata =

Species of beetle

Cephaloleia erugata is a species of rolled-leaf beetle in the family Chrysomelidae. It is found in Panama. The species name is sometimes misspelled as "erugatus" (e.g.).

== Description ==
Adults reach a length of about 6.1 mm. The head and scutellum are black, while the pronotum is yellowish with a medial black macula connected by a thin black vitta. The elytron has a yellowish vitta and a black lateral margin.
