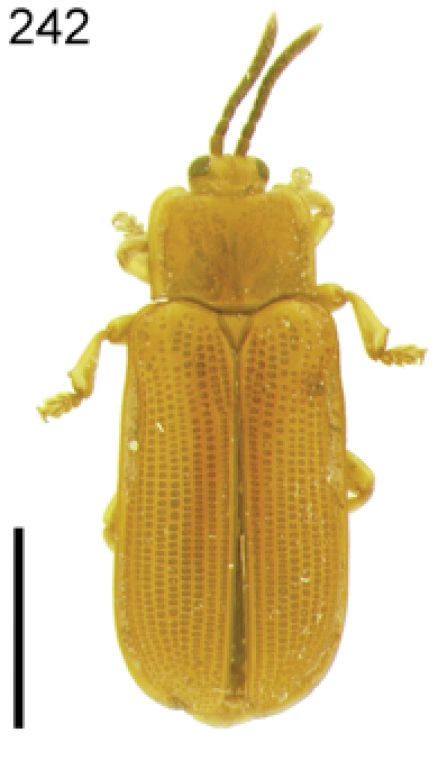

Scientific classification
- Kingdom: Animalia
- Phylum: Arthropoda
- Class: Insecta
- Order: Coleoptera
- Suborder: Polyphaga
- Infraorder: Cucujiformia
- Family: Chrysomelidae
- Genus: Cephaloleia
- Species: C. striata

Binomial name
- Cephaloleia striata Weise, 1910

= Cephaloleia striata =

Species of beetle

Cephaloleia striata is a species of beetle of the family Chrysomelidae. It is found in Brazil and Ecuador.

== Description ==
Adults reach a length of about 7.7–8.1 mm. Adults are reddish-brown with the eyes and apical four antennomeres darker (except the apex of antennomere 11).
