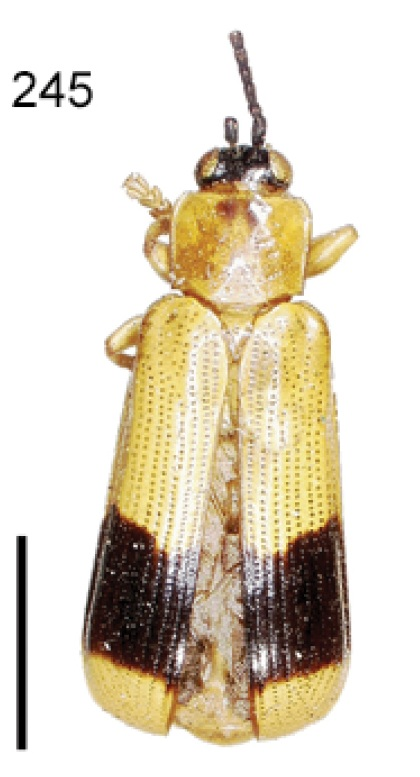

Scientific classification
- Kingdom: Animalia
- Phylum: Arthropoda
- Clade: Pancrustacea
- Class: Insecta
- Order: Coleoptera
- Suborder: Polyphaga
- Infraorder: Cucujiformia
- Family: Chrysomelidae
- Genus: Cephaloleia
- Species: C. succincta

Binomial name
- Cephaloleia succincta Guérin-Méneville, 1844

= Cephaloleia succincta =

Species of beetle

Cephaloleia succincta is a species of beetle of the family Chrysomelidae. It is found in Colombia.

== Description ==
Adults reach a length of about 8.5 mm. Adults are yellowish. The head, antennae, pronotal macula (which may be absent) and transverse elytral vitta on the apical half are all black.
