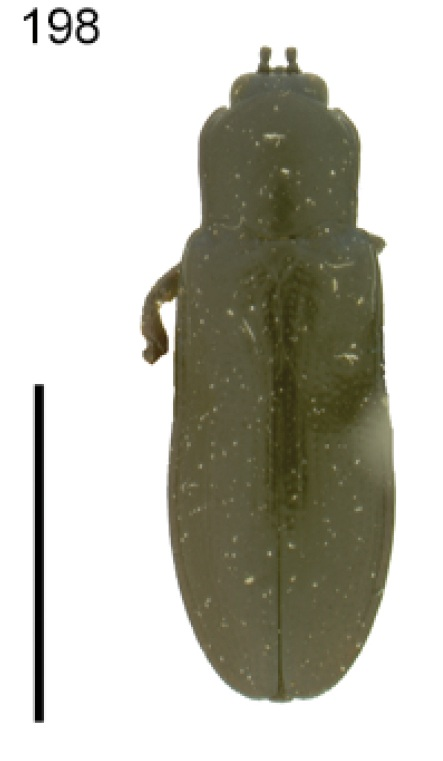

Scientific classification
- Kingdom: Animalia
- Phylum: Arthropoda
- Class: Insecta
- Order: Coleoptera
- Suborder: Polyphaga
- Infraorder: Cucujiformia
- Family: Chrysomelidae
- Genus: Cephaloleia
- Species: C. obsoleta

Binomial name
- Cephaloleia obsoleta Weise, 1910

= Cephaloleia obsoleta =

Species of beetle

Cephaloleia obsoleta is a species of beetle of the family Chrysomelidae. It is found in Brazil.

== Description ==
Adults reach a length of about 5.3–5.8 mm. Adults are shining black, the head with a bluish or greenish metallic sheen.
