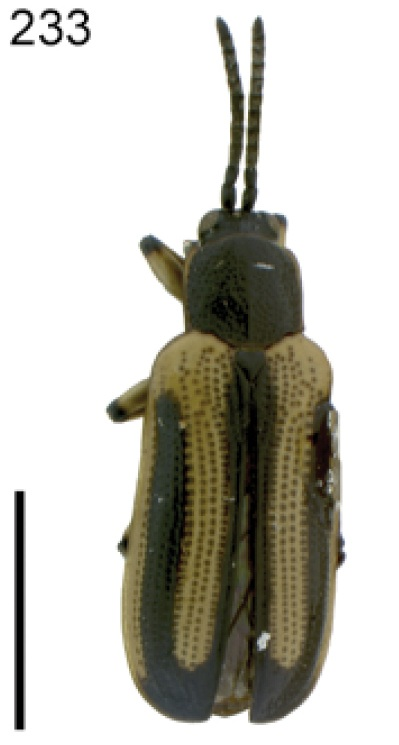

Scientific classification
- Kingdom: Animalia
- Phylum: Arthropoda
- Clade: Pancrustacea
- Class: Insecta
- Order: Coleoptera
- Suborder: Polyphaga
- Infraorder: Cucujiformia
- Family: Chrysomelidae
- Genus: Cephaloleia
- Species: C. scitulus

Binomial name
- Cephaloleia scitulus Staines, 1996

= Cephaloleia scitulus =

Species of beetle

Cephaloleia scitulus is a species of rolled-leaf beetle in the family Chrysomelidae. It is found in Panama.

== Description ==
Adults reach a length of about 5.4–6.9 mm. The head, pronotum (except for the pale anterior and lateral margins), scutellum and antennae are black and the elytron is yellow with a black sutural vitta.
