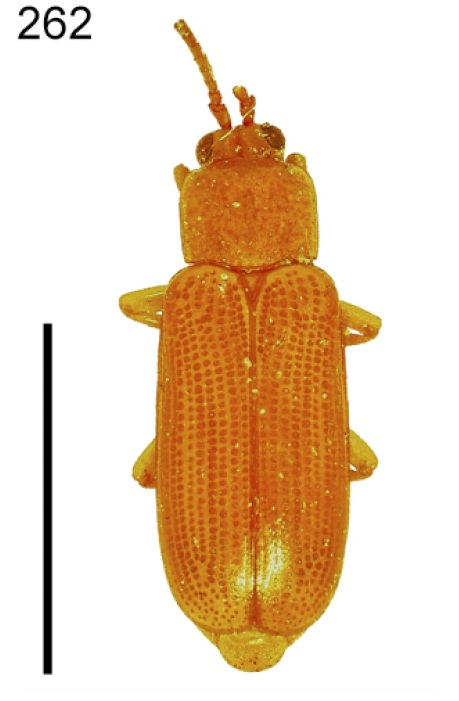

Scientific classification
- Kingdom: Animalia
- Phylum: Arthropoda
- Class: Insecta
- Order: Coleoptera
- Suborder: Polyphaga
- Infraorder: Cucujiformia
- Family: Chrysomelidae
- Genus: Cephaloleia
- Species: C. unctula

Binomial name
- Cephaloleia unctula Pic, 1923

= Cephaloleia unctula =

Species of beetle

Cephaloleia unctula is a species of beetle of the family Chrysomelidae. It is found in Colombia, Bolivia, Ecuador and Peru.

== Description ==
Adults reach a length of about 4.5–5 mm. Adults are reddish-brown, with the eyes darker.
