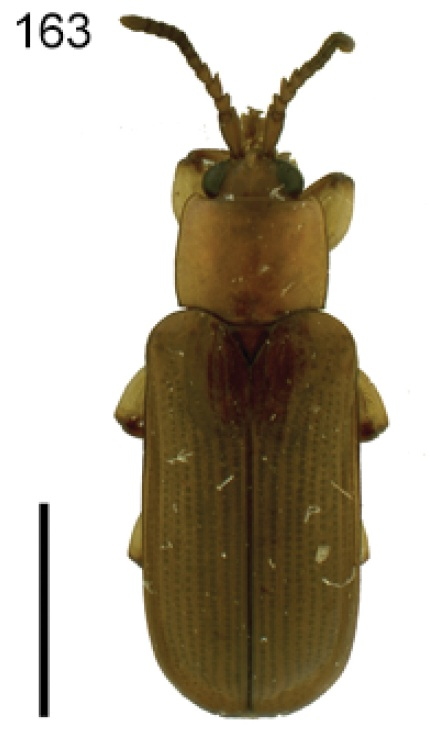

Scientific classification
- Kingdom: Animalia
- Phylum: Arthropoda
- Class: Insecta
- Order: Coleoptera
- Suborder: Polyphaga
- Infraorder: Cucujiformia
- Family: Chrysomelidae
- Genus: Cephaloleia
- Species: C. immaculata

Binomial name
- Cephaloleia immaculata Staines, 1996

= Cephaloleia immaculata =

Species of beetle

Cephaloleia immaculata is a species of rolled-leaf beetle in the family Chrysomelidae. It is found in Costa Rica.

== Description ==
Adults reach a length of about 6.6–7.8 mm. Adults are reddish-brown, with the eyes darker.
