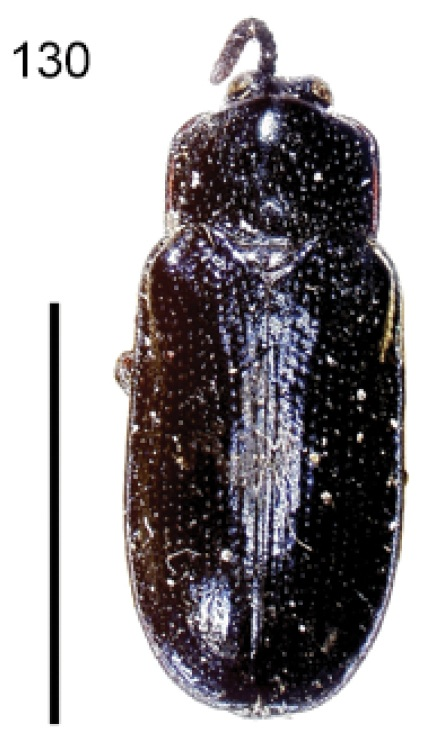

Scientific classification
- Kingdom: Animalia
- Phylum: Arthropoda
- Class: Insecta
- Order: Coleoptera
- Suborder: Polyphaga
- Infraorder: Cucujiformia
- Family: Chrysomelidae
- Genus: Cephaloleia
- Species: C. emarginata

Binomial name
- Cephaloleia emarginata Baly, 1875

= Cephaloleia emarginata =

Species of beetle

Cephaloleia emarginata is a species of beetle of the family Chrysomelidae. It is found in Brazil (Pará) and Ecuador.

== Description ==
Adults reach a length of about 4.5–5.6 mm. Adults are metallic blue with black antennae.
