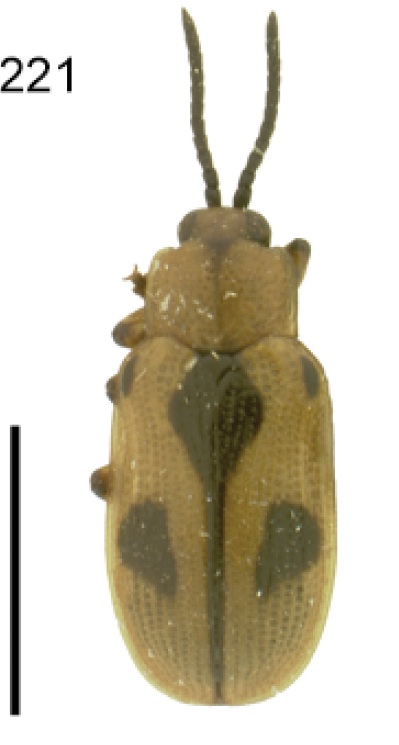

Scientific classification
- Kingdom: Animalia
- Phylum: Arthropoda
- Class: Insecta
- Order: Coleoptera
- Suborder: Polyphaga
- Infraorder: Cucujiformia
- Family: Chrysomelidae
- Genus: Cephaloleia
- Species: C. quinquemaculata

Binomial name
- Cephaloleia quinquemaculata Weise, 1910

= Cephaloleia quinquemaculata =

Species of beetle

Cephaloleia quinquemaculata is a species of beetle of the family Chrysomelidae. It is found in Peru.

== Description ==
Adults reach a length of about 5.5 mm. Adults are pale yellowish, with the eyes, antennae, scutellum and elytral suture and five elytral maculae darker.
