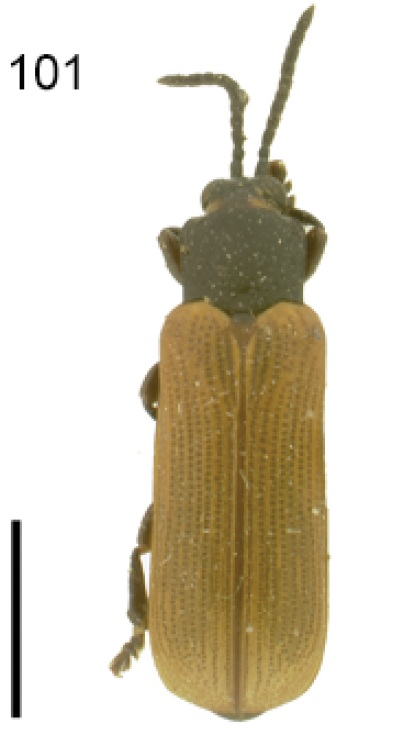

Scientific classification
- Kingdom: Animalia
- Phylum: Arthropoda
- Class: Insecta
- Order: Coleoptera
- Suborder: Polyphaga
- Infraorder: Cucujiformia
- Family: Chrysomelidae
- Genus: Cephaloleia
- Species: C. collaris

Binomial name
- Cephaloleia collaris Weise, 1910

= Cephaloleia collaris =

Species of beetle

Cephaloleia collaris is a species of beetle of the family Chrysomelidae. It is found in Colombia and Venezuela.

== Description ==
Adults reach a length of about 7.9–8.3 mm. Adults are black, while the elytron and scutellum are yellowish-brown and the venter and legs are yellowish-brown.
