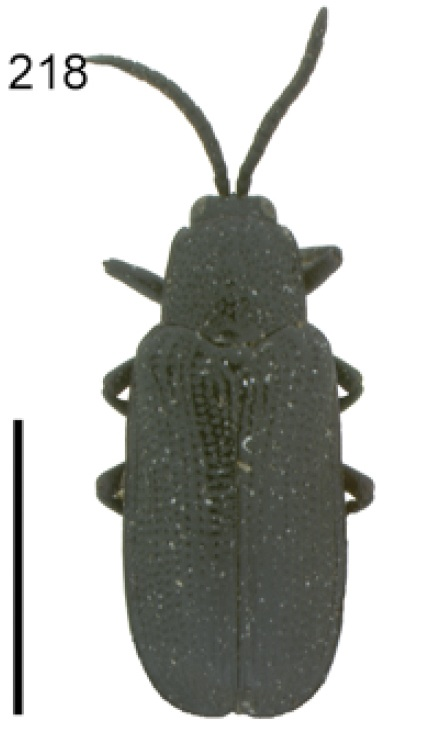

Scientific classification
- Kingdom: Animalia
- Phylum: Arthropoda
- Class: Insecta
- Order: Coleoptera
- Suborder: Polyphaga
- Infraorder: Cucujiformia
- Family: Chrysomelidae
- Genus: Cephaloleia
- Species: C. punctatissima

Binomial name
- Cephaloleia punctatissima Weise, 1910

= Cephaloleia punctatissima =

Species of beetle

Cephaloleia punctatissima is a species of beetle of the family Chrysomelidae. It is found in Mexico.

== Description ==
Adults reach a length of about 5.4 mm. Adults are shining black.
