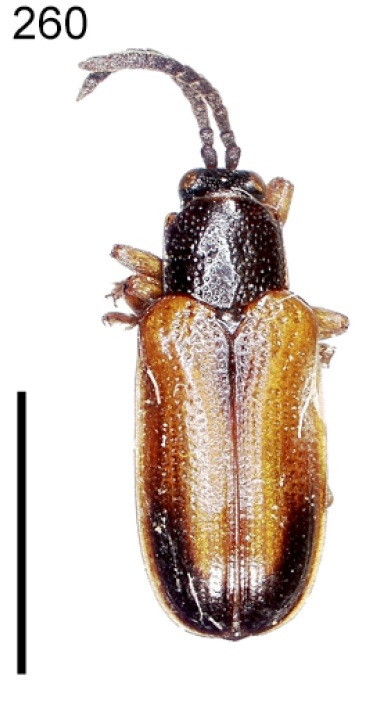

Scientific classification
- Kingdom: Animalia
- Phylum: Arthropoda
- Class: Insecta
- Order: Coleoptera
- Suborder: Polyphaga
- Infraorder: Cucujiformia
- Family: Chrysomelidae
- Genus: Cephaloleia
- Species: C. turrialbana

Binomial name
- Cephaloleia turrialbana Uhmann, 1930

= Cephaloleia turrialbana =

Species of beetle

Cephaloleia turrialbana is a species of beetle of the family Chrysomelidae. It is found in Costa Rica and Panama.

== Description ==
Adults reach a length of about 5 mm. The head, antennae, pronotum and scutellum are dark, while the elytron is reddish-brown with the apical one-fifth dark and with pale lateral margins. The legs are yellowish.
