= Cephaloleia atripes =

Scientific classification
- Kingdom: Animalia
- Phylum: Arthropoda
- Class: Insecta
- Order: Coleoptera
- Suborder: Polyphaga
- Infraorder: Cucujiformia
- Family: Chrysomelidae
- Genus: Cephaloleia
- Species: C. atripes

Binomial name
- Cephaloleia atripes (Pic, 1926)

Synonyms
- Amplipalpa atripes Pic, 1926

Species of beetle

Cephaloleia atripes is a species of beetle of the family Chrysomelidae. It is found in Brazil (Goiás).

== Description ==
Adults have a metallic blue elytron.
