= List of lymantriid genera: L =

The large moth subfamily Lymantriinae contains the following genera beginning with L:

- Labordea
- Lachana
- Lacida
- Lacipa
- Laelaroa
- Laelia
- Laelioproctis
- Lanitra
- Lepidolacipa
- Lepidopalpus
- Leptaroa
- Leptepilepta
- Leptocneria
- Leucoma
- Leucoperina
- Locharna
- Lomadonta
- Lymantica
- Lymantria
- Lymantriades
