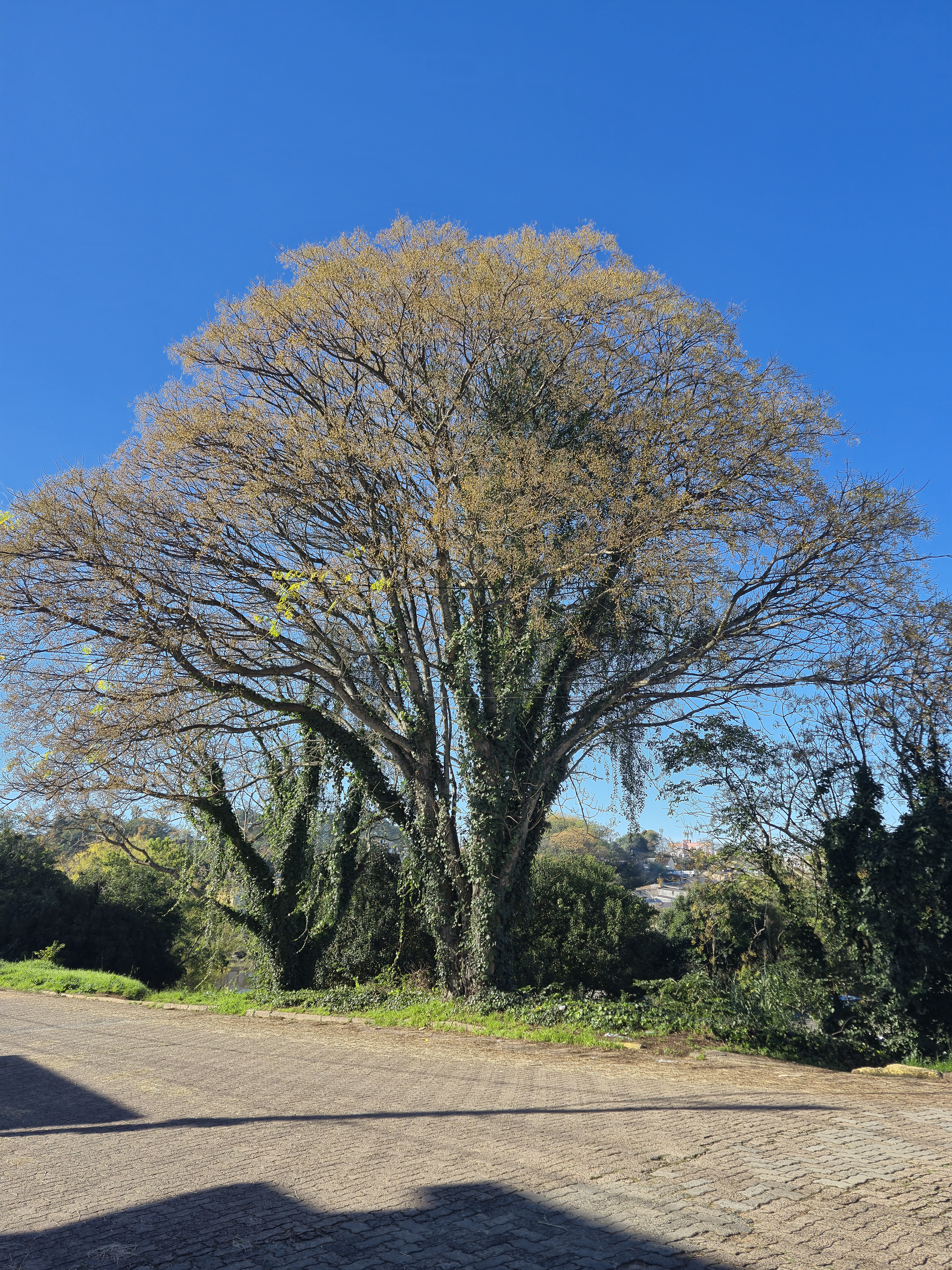
- Tree with fruits in late autumn, Brazil
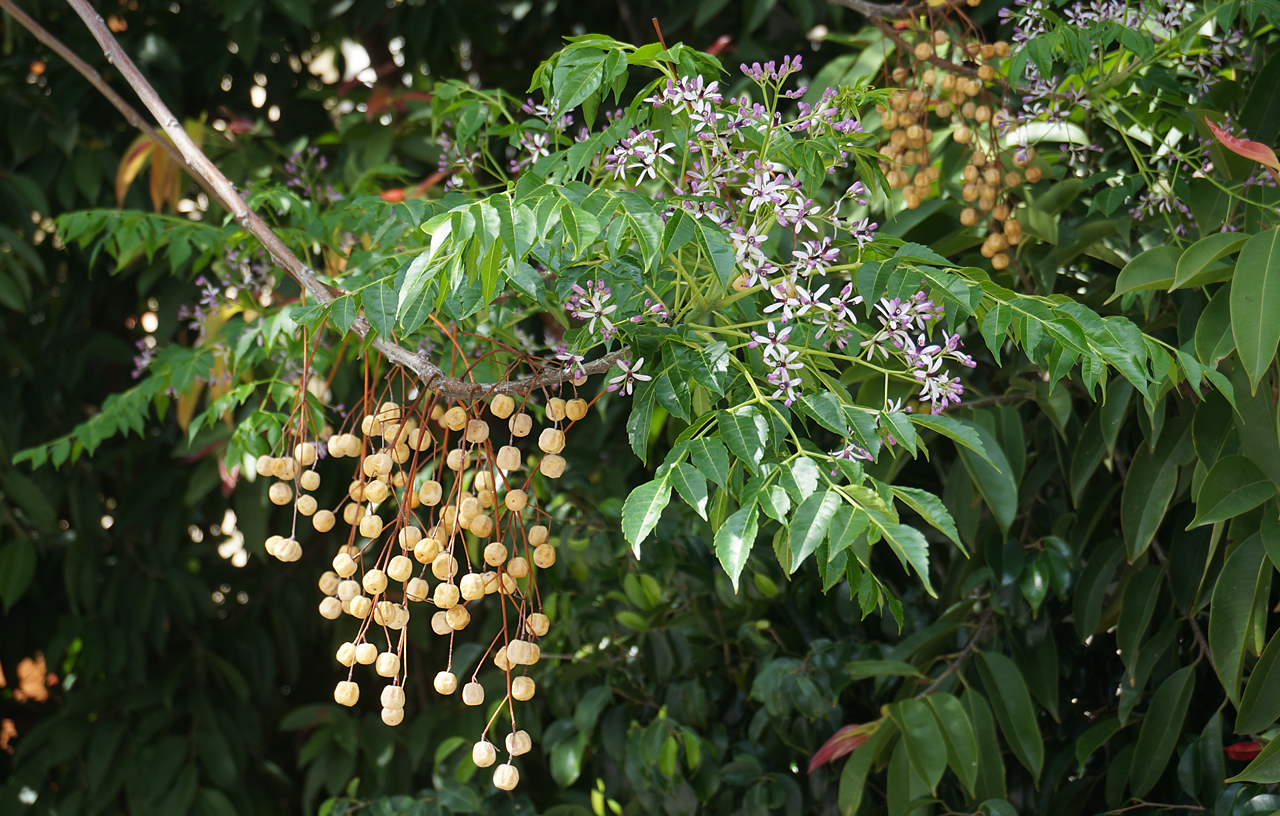
- Leaves, flowers, and fruit

Conservation status
- Least Concern (IUCN 3.1)

Scientific classification
- Kingdom: Plantae
- Clade: Tracheophytes
- Clade: Angiosperms
- Clade: Eudicots
- Clade: Rosids
- Order: Sapindales
- Family: Meliaceae
- Genus: Melia
- Species: M. azedarach

Binomial name
- Melia azedarach L.

Synonyms
- List: Azedara speciosa Raf.; Azedarach commelinii Medik.; Azedarach deleteria Medik.; Azedarach fraxinifolia Moench; Azedarach odoratum Noronha; Azedarach sempervirens Kuntze; Azedarach sempervirens var. glabrior (C.DC.) Kuntze; Azedarach sempervirens f. incisodentata Kuntze; Azedarach sempervirens f. longifoliola Kuntze; Azedarach sempervirens f. subdentata Kuntze; Melia azedarach var. intermedia (Makino) Makino; Melia azedarach var. subtripinnata Miq.; Melia azedarach var. toosendan (Siebold & Zucc.) Makino; Melia bukayun Royle; Melia cochinchinensis M.Roem.; Melia commelini Medik. ex Steud.; Melia composita Benth.; Melia florida Salisb.; Melia guineensis G.Don; Melia japonica G.Don; Melia japonica var. semperflorens Makino; Melia orientalis M.Roem.; Melia sambucina Blume; Melia sempervirens Sw.; Melia toosendan Siebold & Zucc.

= Melia azedarach =

Species of plant

Melia azedarach, commonly known as the chinaberry tree, pride of India, bead-tree, Cape lilac, syringa berrytree, Persian lilac, Indian lilac, or white cedar, is a species of deciduous tree in the mahogany family, Meliaceae, that is native to Indomalaya and Australasia.

== Description ==
The fully grown tree has a rounded crown, and commonly measures 7–12 metres (20–40 feet) tall, exceptionally 45 m (150 ft).

The leaves are up to 50 centimetres (20 inches) long, alternate, long-petioled, two or three times compound (odd-pinnate); the leaflets are dark green above and lighter green below, with serrate margins.

The flowers are small and fragrant, with five pale purple or lilac petals, growing in clusters.

The fruit is a drupe, marble-sized, light yellow at maturity, hanging on the tree all winter, and gradually becoming wrinkled and almost white.

Melia azedarach has a short lifespan, averaging about 20 years.

=== Chemistry ===
Italo et al. 2009 and Safithri and Sari 2016 report flavonoids and phenols found in M. azedarach.

== Etymology ==
The genus name Melia is derived from μελία (melía), the Greek word used by Theophrastus (c. 371 – c. 287 BC) for Fraxinus ornus, which has similar leaves. The species name azedarach is from the French: azédarac, which in turn is from the Persian: آزاددرخت, lit. 'free- or noble tree'.

Melia azedarach should not be confused with the Azadirachta trees, which are in the same family, but a different genus.

Its common name derives from the fact that its range includes China and it produces berries.

== Ecology ==
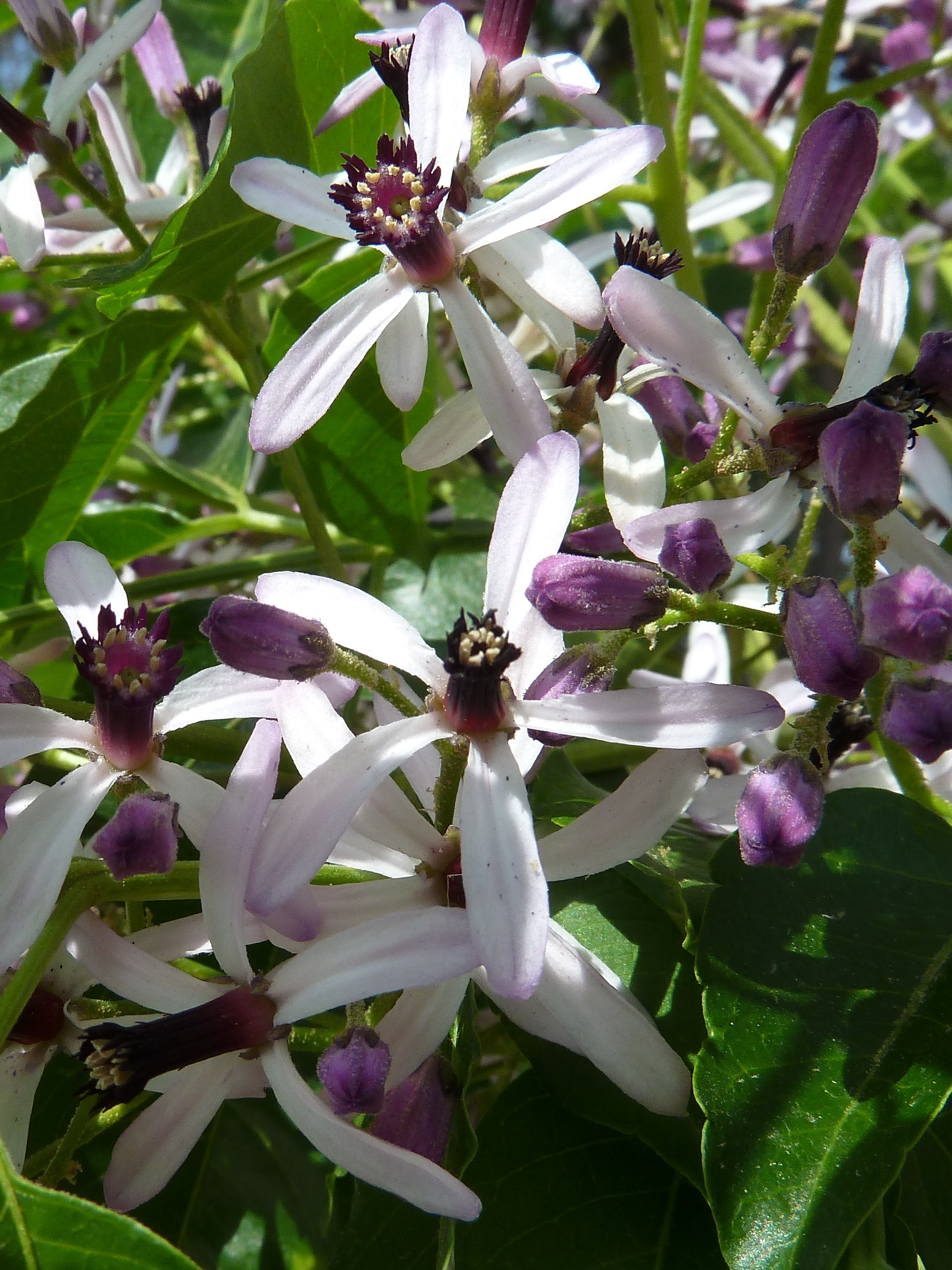
Close-up of the flowers

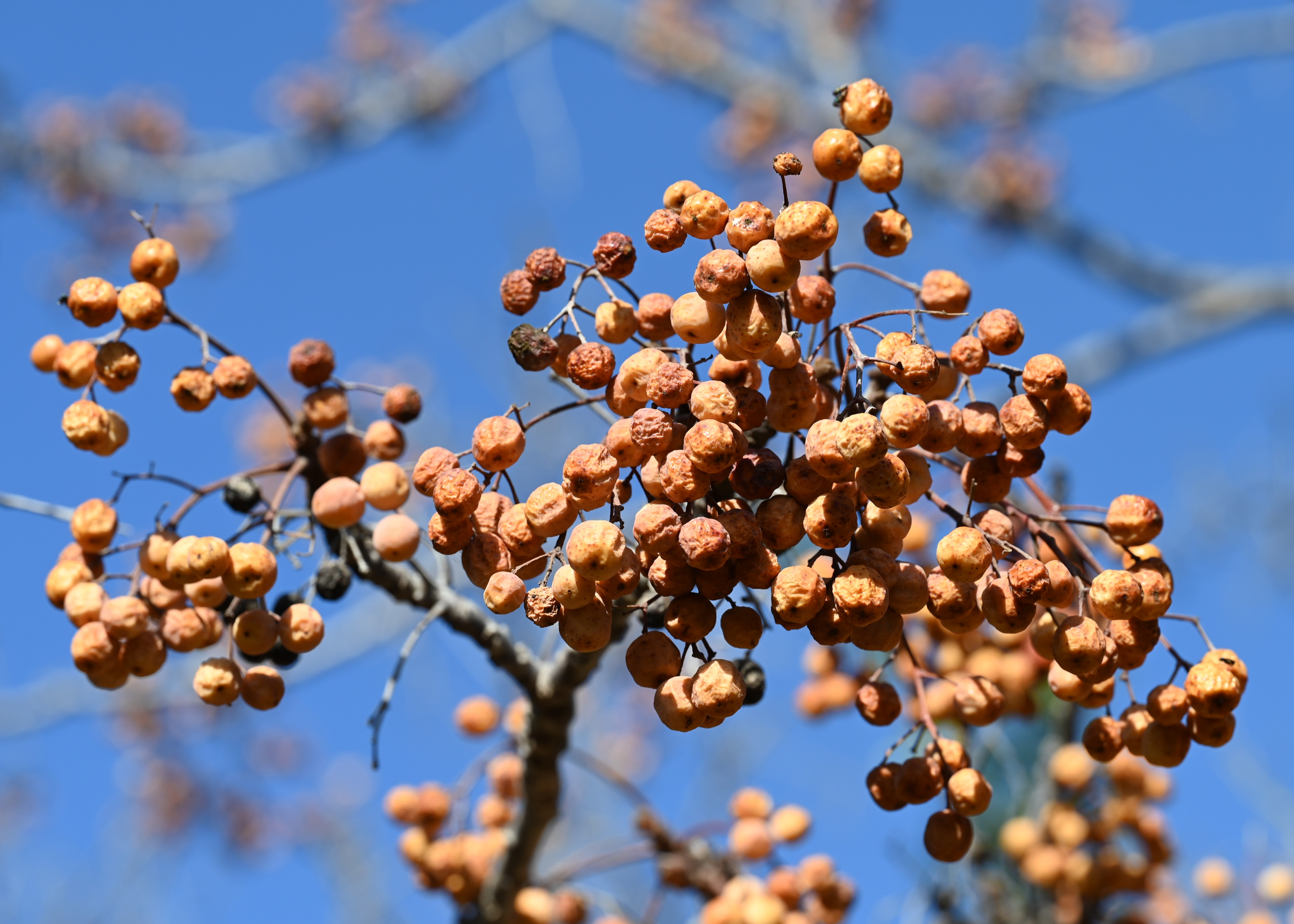
Close-up of a cluster of ripe fruits

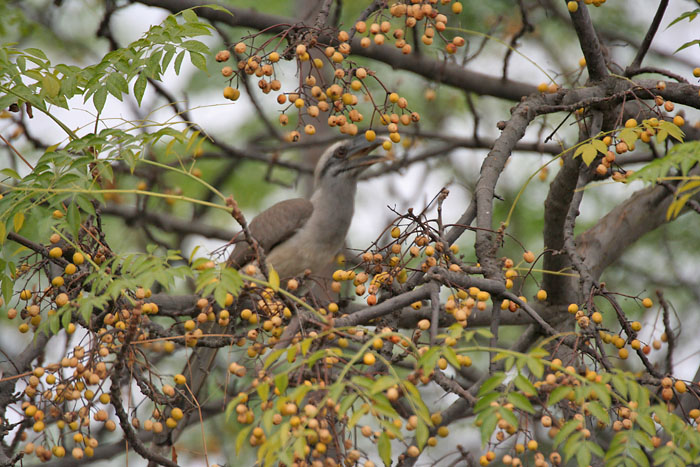
Indian grey hornbill eating Melia azedarach fruit in Uttarakhand, India.

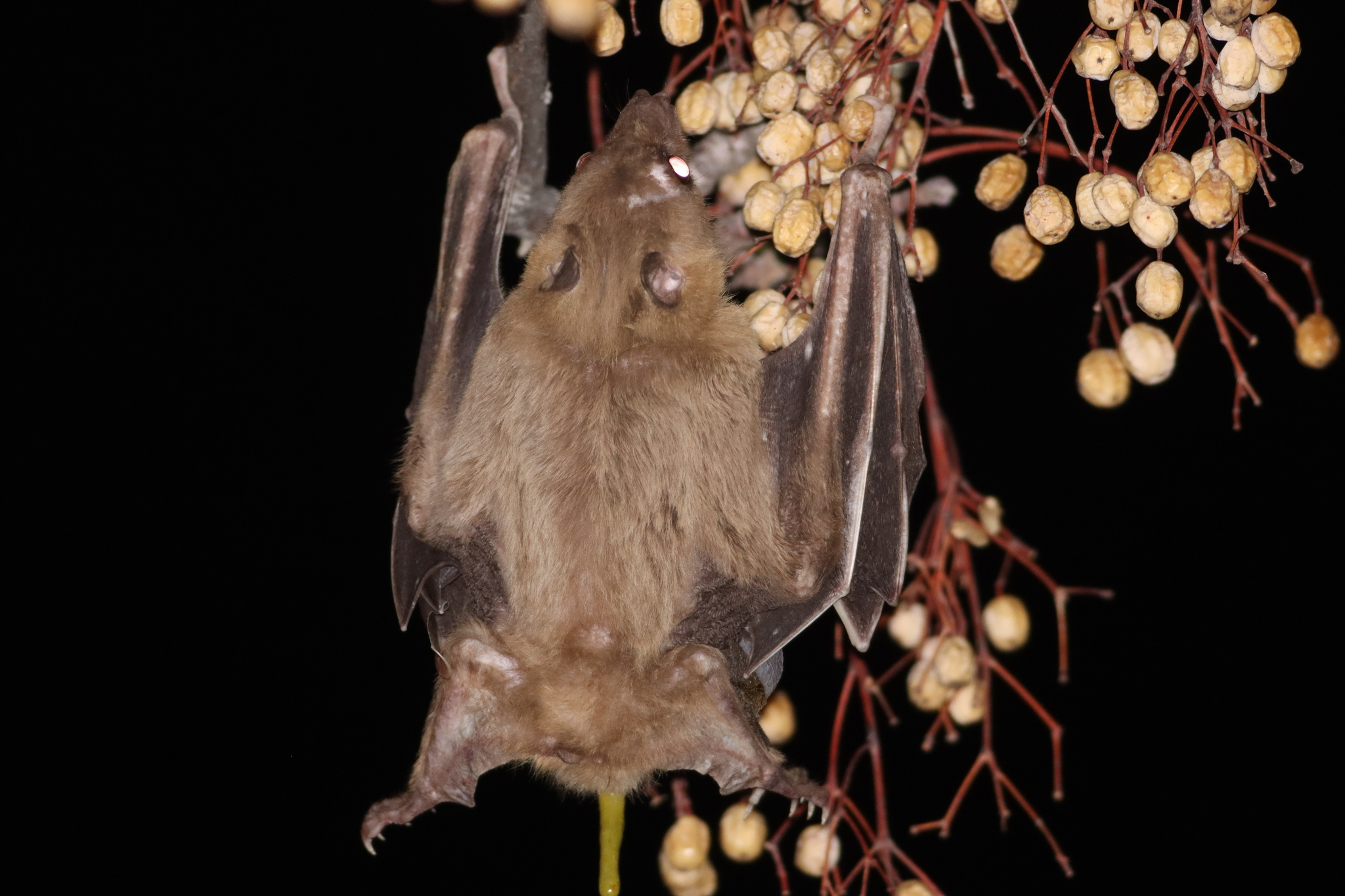
Egyptian rousette feeding on chinaberries, in Turkey

Some hummingbirds like the sapphire-spangled emerald (Amazilia lactea), glittering-bellied emerald (Chlorostilbon lucidus) and planalto hermit (Phaethornis pretrei) have been recorded as feeding on and pollinating the flowers, though only opportunistically. Bees and butterflies do not use the flower (or the nectar), so it serves no pollinator benefit in places where it has been introduced such as the United States.

Pests such as cape lilac tree caterpillars (Leptocneria reducta) have been known to severely defoliate the tree and cause large-scale damage to stands of the trees in Australia. The fungal plant pathogen Pseudocercospora subsessilis is found on the leaves of the tree, causing leaf spots.

A mature Chinaberry tree can survive versatile environments, withstanding temperatures as low as -5˚C and as high as 39˚C. According to the USDA, the tree exists as far north as New York.

== Uses ==
The plant was introduced around 1830 as an ornamental in the United States (South Carolina and Georgia) and widely planted in the southern states, where its leaves were used to repel insects and its berries were used for homemade whiskey and soap. The plant was introduced into Hawaii in 1840. It is considered an invasive species in Texas, Oklahoma, and as far north as Virginia. U.S. nurseries continue to sell the trees, however, and the seeds are also widely available. It has become naturalized in tropical and warm temperate regions of the Americas and is intentionally planted in similar climates around the world. It is an ornamental tree in the southern part of Korea.

In Australia, white cedar is commonly planted in parks, public gardens, stream banks, and along footpaths or roadsides. Particularly in the suburbs of Melbourne, the tree is used in nature strip plantings by local councils for amenity reasons as well as environmental, social, and economic benefits. The fragrant lilac flowers and yellow fruits make it an appealing ornamental tree. The hard seeds of the plant are also used in arts and crafts, such as making beads for rosaries. It has been noted to be a prolific seed producer and in Australia has naturalized outside its native range and is especially invasive in the Northern Territory and Western Australia, and is considered a weed in the latter state and in New Zealand since it has the ability to colonise an area (via bird-dropped seed) if left unchecked.

In Kenya the trees have been grown by farmers and used as fodder for livestock. The leaves can be fed to cattle to improve milk yields and farm incomes. The taste is not as bitter as that of the leaves of neem (Azadirachta indica).

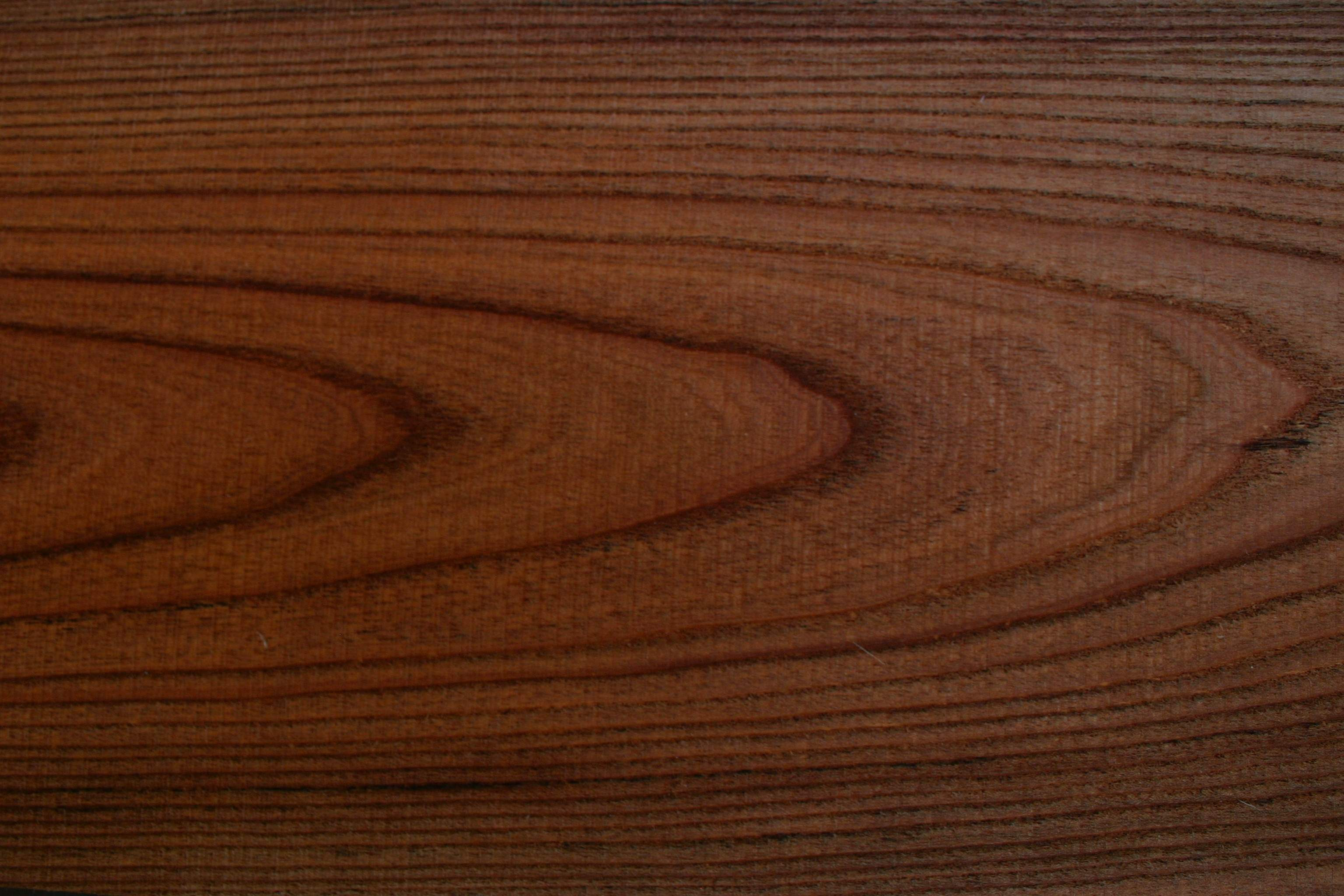
Melia azedarach plank

The main utility of chinaberry is its timber, which is of medium density and ranges in colour from light brown to dark red. In appearance it is readily confused with the unrelated Burmese teak (Tectona grandis). Melia azedarach, in keeping with other members of the family Meliaceae, has a timber of high quality, but in comparison to many almost-extinct species of mahogany, it is under-utilised. Seasoning is relatively simple — planks dry without cracking or warping and are resistant to fungal infection.

The tough, five-grooved seeds were once widely used for making rosaries and other products requiring beads, though in the modern era the seeds have often been replaced by plastics. The cut branches with mature fruit are sold commercially to the florist and landscaping trade, particularly as a component for outdoor holiday decor. The fruits may persist for some time prior to shattering off the stem or discoloring, which occurs rapidly after a relatively short time in subfreezing weather.

M. azedarach leaves and fruits have been used as a natural insecticide to keep with stored food, but must not be eaten as they are highly poisonous. Placing the berries in, for example, drying apples and keeping the fruit turned in the sun without damaging any of the chinaberry skin will prevent insect larvae from growing in the dried apples. A mature tree can yield approximately 15 kilograms of fruit annually.

The species has also been used as a traditional herbal medicine. A diluted infusion of the leaves has been used in the past to induce uterine relaxation. The tree's limonoid compounds have useful anticancer and antimalarial effects.

== Toxicity ==
The fruits have evolved to be eaten by animals, which eat the flesh surrounding the hard endocarp or ingest the entire fruit and later vent the endocarp. If the endocarp is crushed or damaged during ingestion or digestion, the animal will be exposed to the toxins within the seed. The processes of mastication and digestion, and the degree of immunity to the particular toxins, vary widely between species, and there is accordingly great variation in clinical symptoms following ingestion.

The fruits are poisonous or narcotic to humans if eaten in large quantities. According to Chinese medical literature, human poisoning can occur if 6–9 fruits, 30–40 seeds, or 400 grams of bark are eaten. The toxins include neurotoxins and unidentified resins, found mainly in the fruits. The first symptoms of poisoning appear a few hours after ingestion. They may include loss of appetite, vomiting, constipation or diarrhea, bloody faeces, stomach pain, pulmonary congestion, cardiac arrest, rigidity, lack of coordination and general weakness. Death may take place after about 24 hours. As in its relatives, tetranortriterpenoids constitute an important toxic principle. These are chemically related to azadirachtin, the primary insecticidal compound in the commercially important neem oil. These compounds are probably related to the wood and seed's resistance to pest infestation, and maybe to the unattractiveness of the flowers to animals. The plant is toxic to cats.

However, these toxins are not harmful to many species of bird, who gorge themselves on the fruit, eventually reaching a "drunken" state. The birds that are able to eat the fruit spread the intact seeds in their droppings.
