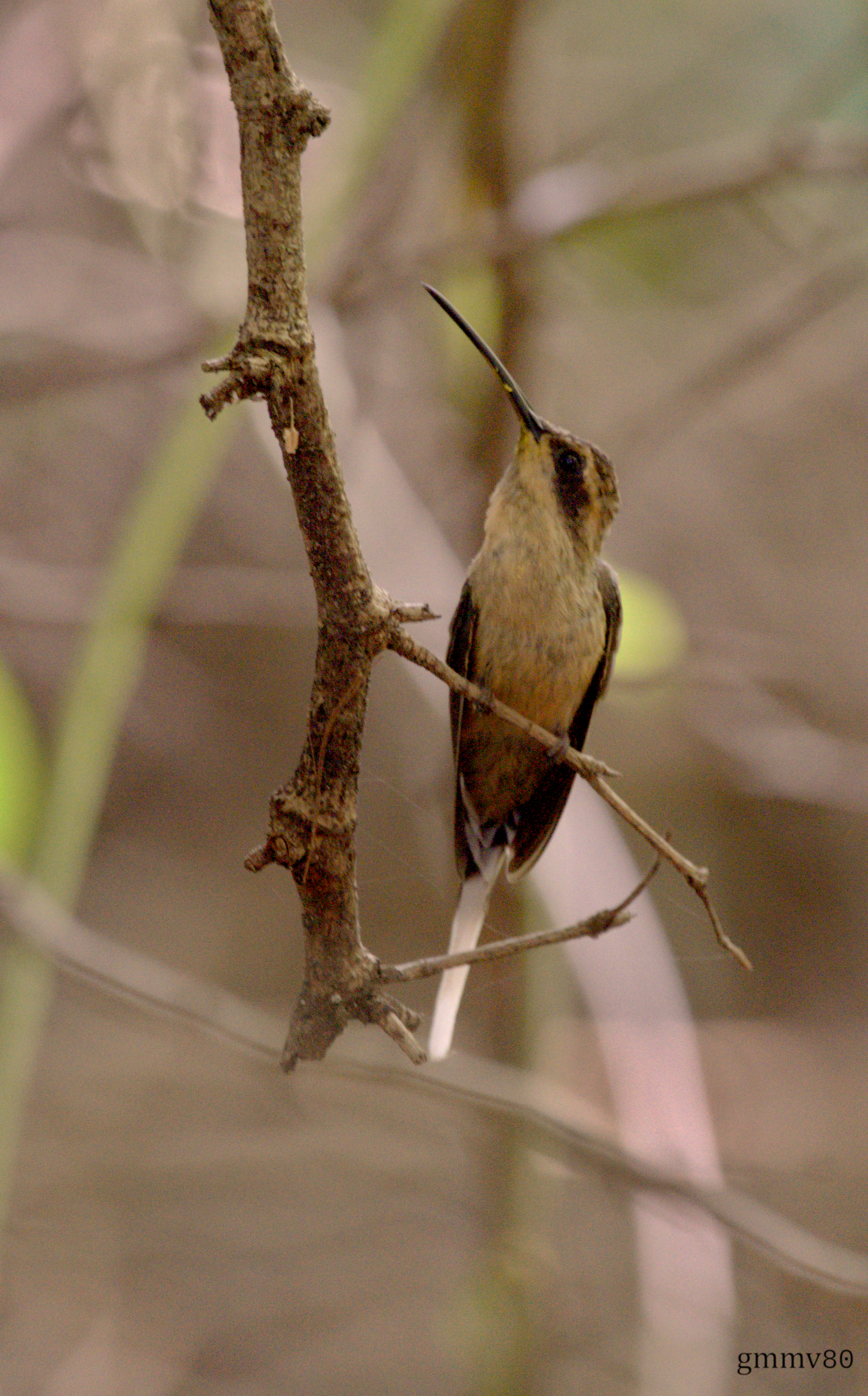

Conservation status
- Least Concern (IUCN 3.1)
- CITES Appendix II

Scientific classification
- Kingdom: Animalia
- Phylum: Chordata
- Class: Aves
- Order: Apodiformes
- Family: Trochilidae
- Genus: Phaethornis
- Species: P. subochraceus

Binomial name
- Phaethornis subochraceus Todd, 1915

= Buff-bellied hermit =

Species of hummingbird

The buff-bellied hermit (Phaethornis subochraceus) is a species of bird in the family Trochilidae, the hummingbirds. It is found in Bolivia and Brazil.

== Taxonomy and systematics ==
The buff-bellied hermit is closely related to the sooty-capped hermit (P. augusti) and planalto hermit (P. pretrei). It is monotypic.

== Description ==
The buff-bellied hermit is 11 to 12 cm (4.3 to 4.7 in) long and weighs 3.5 to 4 g (0.12 to 0.14 oz). It has metallic green upperparts and ochre to buff underparts. The innermost pair of tail feathers are longer than the others and all have white tips.

== Distribution and habitat ==
The buff-bellied hermit is found in the eastern Andean foothills of Bolivia from southern Beni to eastern Santa Cruz departments and into the Brazilian states of Mato Grosso and Mato Grosso do Sul. It has also been recorded as a vagrant in Paraguay. It inhabits the understory of several landscapes including deciduous and semi-deciduous forest, secondary forest, open woodland, and shrubland. In elevation it ranges from 150 to 800 m (490 to 2,600 ft).

== Behavior ==
=== Movement ===
Observations of the buff-bellied hermit in eastern Bolivia showed no evidence of movement.

=== Feeding ===
The buff-bellied hermit feeds on nectar from a wide variety of flowering plants and also on small arthropods.

=== Breeding ===
The buff-bellied hermit's breeding season has not been conclusively determined, but observations hint that it is during the November to April wet season. Males congregate at leks. The nest has not been described.

=== Vocalization ===
The buff-bellied hermit's song is "a continuously repeated high-pitched phrase...a short note followed by a rising one...or a short note followed by a falling one 'tsi-tsew', up to a more complex 'tsi-tsi-tseeé-euw'."

== Status ==
The IUCN has assessed the buff-bellied hermit as being of Least Concern, though its population size is unknown and believed to be decreasing. It is locally common but "[p]oorly known, and should perhaps be classed as Data Deficient."
