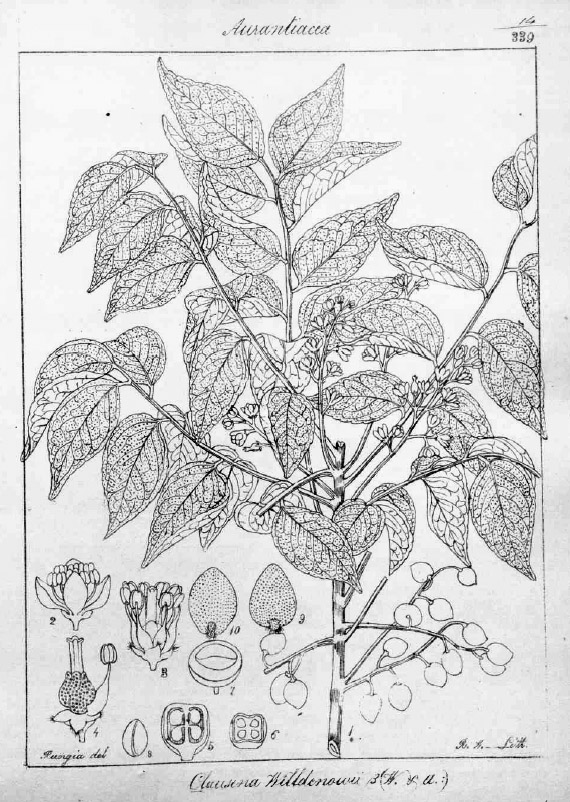

Conservation status
- Least Concern (IUCN 3.1)

Scientific classification
- Kingdom: Plantae
- Clade: Tracheophytes
- Clade: Angiosperms
- Clade: Eudicots
- Clade: Rosids
- Order: Sapindales
- Family: Rutaceae
- Genus: Clausena
- Species: C. anisata

Binomial name
- Clausena anisata (Willd.) Hook.f. ex Benth.

= Clausena anisata =

Species of flowering plant

Clausena anisata is a deciduous shrub or small tree, belonging to the Rutaceae (citrus) family, and widespread in the Sub-Saharan Africa, but absent from drier regions. It is also found in tropical and South-East Asia, India and Sri Lanka. It is cultivated in Malaysia and Indonesia. As with other plants useful to mankind its large range of medicinal properties has led to a global distribution and its growth wherever the climate is suitable. It grows in higher-rainfall regions in savanna, thickets, riverine forest, disturbed areas and secondary forest, up to an altitude of 3000 m. The leaves, which are foetid when bruised, give rise to the common name horsewood or the more descriptive Afrikaans common name perdepis, meaning 'horse urine'.

This species is one of 25 in the genus Clausena, first described in 1768 by the Dutch botanist Nicolaas Laurens Burman, and named for the Norwegian clergyman, Peder Claussøn Friis (1545–1614), the translator of the Icelandic historian and poet, Snorri Sturluson.

== Description ==
Up to 10 m tall, this species has smooth, thin, grey-green bark becoming brownish and mottled with age. Young parts are puberulous. The compound leaves are up to 30 cm long and stipules are absent. Leaflets are 11–37 in number, alternate to sub-opposite, and ovate to narrowly elliptical in shape, with a markedly asymmetric, rounded or cuneate base. The leaflet apex is obtuse or notched, and the margins are entire or crenulate. The leaf surfaces are densely covered with embedded, pellucid glands, which are strongly aromatic when bruised. The inflorescence is a hairy, lax axillary panicle. The scented flowers are bisexual, regular, and 4-merous. Sepals are about 1 mm long, while the elliptical petals are 3–7 mm long, concave, and cream to yellowish-white in colour. The 8 stamens have filaments 2–6 mm long, which are thickened at their base. Fruit an ovoid, fleshy berry, 3.3–7 mm in diameter, single-seeded and turning red or purplish-black when mature. Timber is yellowish-white, elastic and dense (0.8 g/cm^{3}).

== Phytochemicals ==
As with other species of the family Rutaceae, the leaves, fruits and stem bark are rich in aromatic essential oils. Carbazole alkaloids are the major constituents of plants in this family, with coumarins and phenylpropanoids which are named clausamines.

Analysis shows the presence of estragole, (E)-anethole, (E)-foeniculin, β-pinene, sabinene, (Z)-β-ocimene, germacrene B, (E)-β-ocimene and terpinen-4-ol, (Z)-tagetenone, (E)-tagetenone, (E)-nerolidol, germacrene D, methyl chavicol, myrcene, limonene, β-caryophyllene, 3-carene, β-humulene, coumarins of the furanocoumarin type - imperatorin, isoimperatorin, oxypeucedanine, bergaptene, xanthotoxin, xanthotoxol and chalepin, geranylcoumarin (anisocoumarin A–I), furanocoumarin-lactone type (indicolactone, anisolactone), the tetranortriterpenoids limonin, zapoterin, clausenolide, carbazole alkaloids furanoclausamine A and B, clausamine B, C, D and E, mukonal, glycosinine, mukonidine and clausine F, and the pyranocarbazole alkaloid mupamine.

Five major essential oils from the leaf - β-pinene, sabinene, germacrene-D, estragole and linalool - are efficacious control agents of the larvae of Culex quinquefasciatus, Aedes aegypti and Anopheles stephensi. They are also effective insecticides and deterrents when used in stored foods. Tenebrio molitor, Rhyzopertha dominica, Sitophilus zeamais and other species suffer almost complete mortality. The oils also block the reproduction of Tribolium castaneum when used as a fumigant, or added to wheat flour at a concentration of 0.2% by weight. These essential oils are generally considered harmless to human beings and are routinely used in flavouring, perfumes, confectionery and pharmaceuticals.

An extract of the twigs shows activity against Plasmodium falciparum. The oils also affect Salmonella typhimurium, Pseudomonas aeruginosa, Alcaligenes faecalis, Bacillus subtilis, Enterococcus faecalis, Flavobacterium suaveolens, Leuconostoc mesenteroides ssp. cremoris and Serratia marcescens. Clausenol is active against a number of Gram-positive and Gram-negative bacteria and fungi, such as Alternaria alternata, Aspergillus parasiticus, Geotrichum candidum, Phytophthora palmivora and Penicillium citrinum. Leaf extracts strongly affect the fungi causing oral candidiasis and skin infections - Candida albicans, Candida glabrata, Candida tropicalis, Candida parapsilosis, Candida krusei and Cryptococcus neoformans. A methanolic extract from the roots shows molluscicidal results in Bulinus globosus, the intermediate host in schistosomiasis. The coumarins heliettin and imperatorin are toxic to snails - imperatorin also shows anticonvulsant activity. Essential oils from the leaves also show moderate antioxidant activity in vitro, while root extracts show hypoglycaemic activity. Chalepin exhibits anticoagulant activity and when administered intraperitoneally causes the death of 40% of treated rats within 48 hours. Clausamines D–G inhibit early antigen activation of the Epstein–Barr virus. Leaf extracts have a mild effect on HIV-1 and HIV-2 strains, and HIV-1 reverse transcriptase. Clausamine E is cytotoxic to the human leukemia cell line HL60.

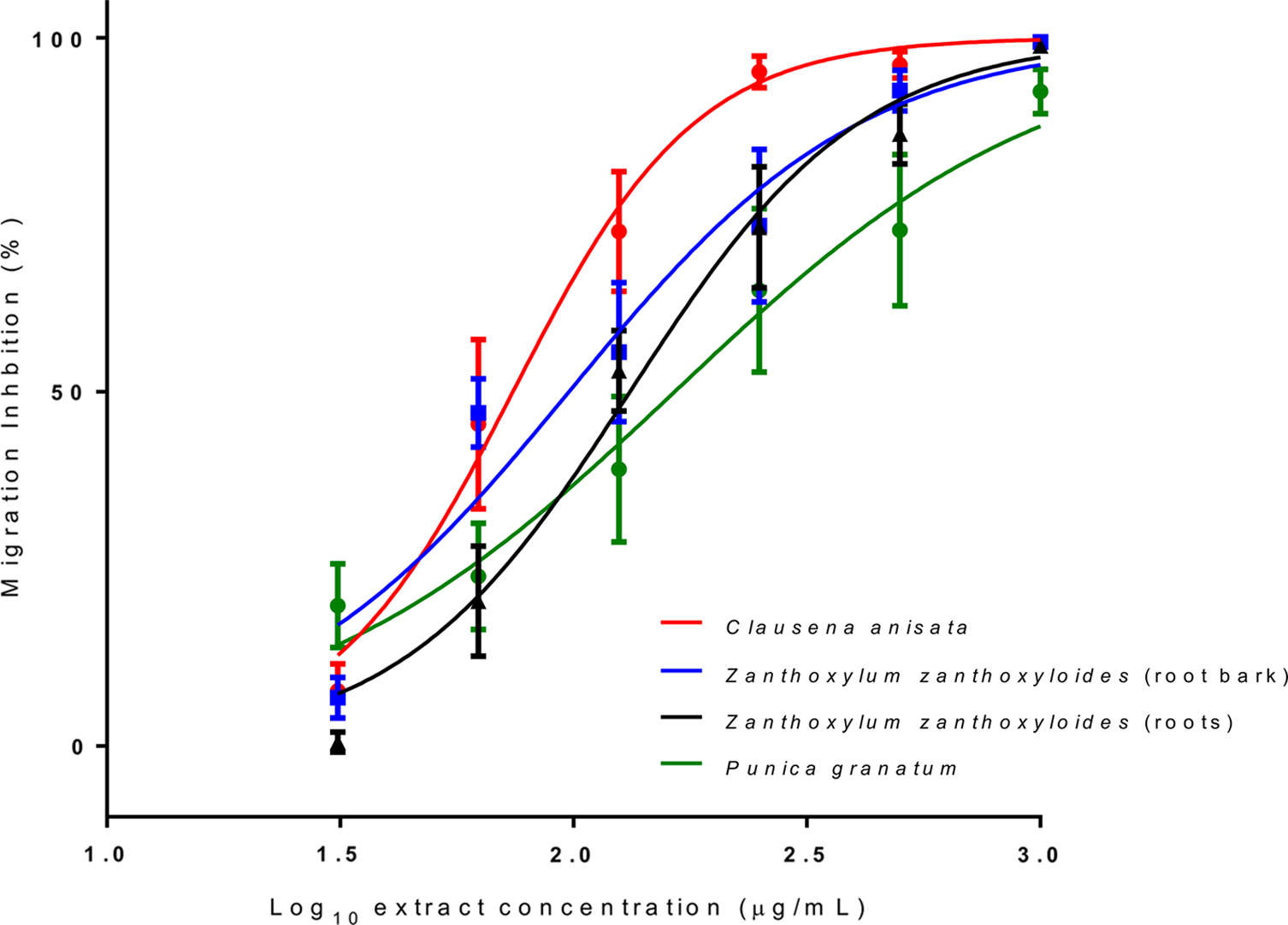
Dose-dependent inhibition of migration of Ascaris suum third-stage larvae after exposure to extracts of three different medicinal plants; Clausena anisata in red

In 2016, a study by Williams, Soelberg and Jäger showed than ethanolic extracts of Clausena anisata have in vitro anthelmintic properties against the nematode Ascaris suum, a swine parasite that is closely related to the human parasite A. lumbricoides. The half maximal effective concentration (EC50) value was 74 μg/mL. The authors concluded that these results encourage further investigation of the use of this plant as complementary treatment options for ascariasis.

== Medicinal uses ==
This species is used in treating an uncommonly wide range of ailments and conditions. Decoctions of the leaves or roots are taken for gastro-intestinal disorders, fever, pneumonia, headache, hypotension, sore throat and sinusitis, venereal diseases, as an aphrodisiac and anthelmintic, as a tonic for pregnant women, and as a tonic for infants to prevent rickets and to control convulsions. Root decoctions and infusions are also taken for whooping cough, malaria, syphilis and kidney ailments, irregular menses, threatening abortion, skin diseases and epilepsy, and given to women before and after parturition to ease delivery and to expel blood from the uterus, and later to boost milk production. Roots are chewed to combat indigestion.

Crushed leaves are used as an antiseptic and analgesic, and are applied to open wounds, mouth infections, otitis and abscesses, also burns, haemorrhoids, rheumatism and general body pains. Crushed leaves are also used to treat wounds in domestic animals, and as a snake-bite antidote. Dried leaves are widely used as an arthropod repellent, such as a filling material for mattresses and pillows against fleas, lice and bedbugs. The fruits are sweet and readily eaten by people and other animals. Stem bark is pounded and used as rope.

== Synonyms ==
- Amyris anisata Willd.
- Amyris dentata Willd.
- Amyris inaequalis (DC.) Spreng.
- Amyris nana Roxb.
- Amyris suffruticosa Roxb.
- Clausena anisata var. mollis Engl.
- Clausena anisata var. multijuga Welw. ex Hiern
- Clausena anisata var. paucijuga (Kurz) Molino
- Clausena bergeyckiana De Wild. & T.Durand
- Clausena dentata (Willd.) M.Roem.
- Clausena dentata var. dunniana (H.Lév.) Swingle
- Clausena dentata var. nana (Roxb.) N.P.Balakr.
- Clausena dentata var. pubescens (Wight & Arn.) N.P.Balakr.
- Clausena dentata var. robusta Yu.Tanaka
- Clausena dunniana H.Lév.
- Clausena dunniana var. robusta (Tanaka) C.C.Huang
- Clausena inaequalis (DC.) Benth.
- Clausena inaequalis var. abyssinica Engl.
- Clausena longipes Craib
- Clausena nana (Roxb.) Wight & Arn.
- Clausena odorata C.C.Huang
- Clausena pobeguinii Pobeg.
- Clausena pubescens Wight & Arn.
- Clausena suffruticosa (Roxb.) Wight & Arn.
- Clausena suffruticosa var. paucijuga Kurz
- Clausena vestita D.D.Tao
- Clausena wightii M.Roem.
- Clausena willdenowii Wight & Arn. (illegitimate)
- Cookia dulcis Bedd.
- Elaphrium inaequale DC.
- Fagarastrum anisatum G.Don
- Myaris inaequalis (DC.) C.Presl
