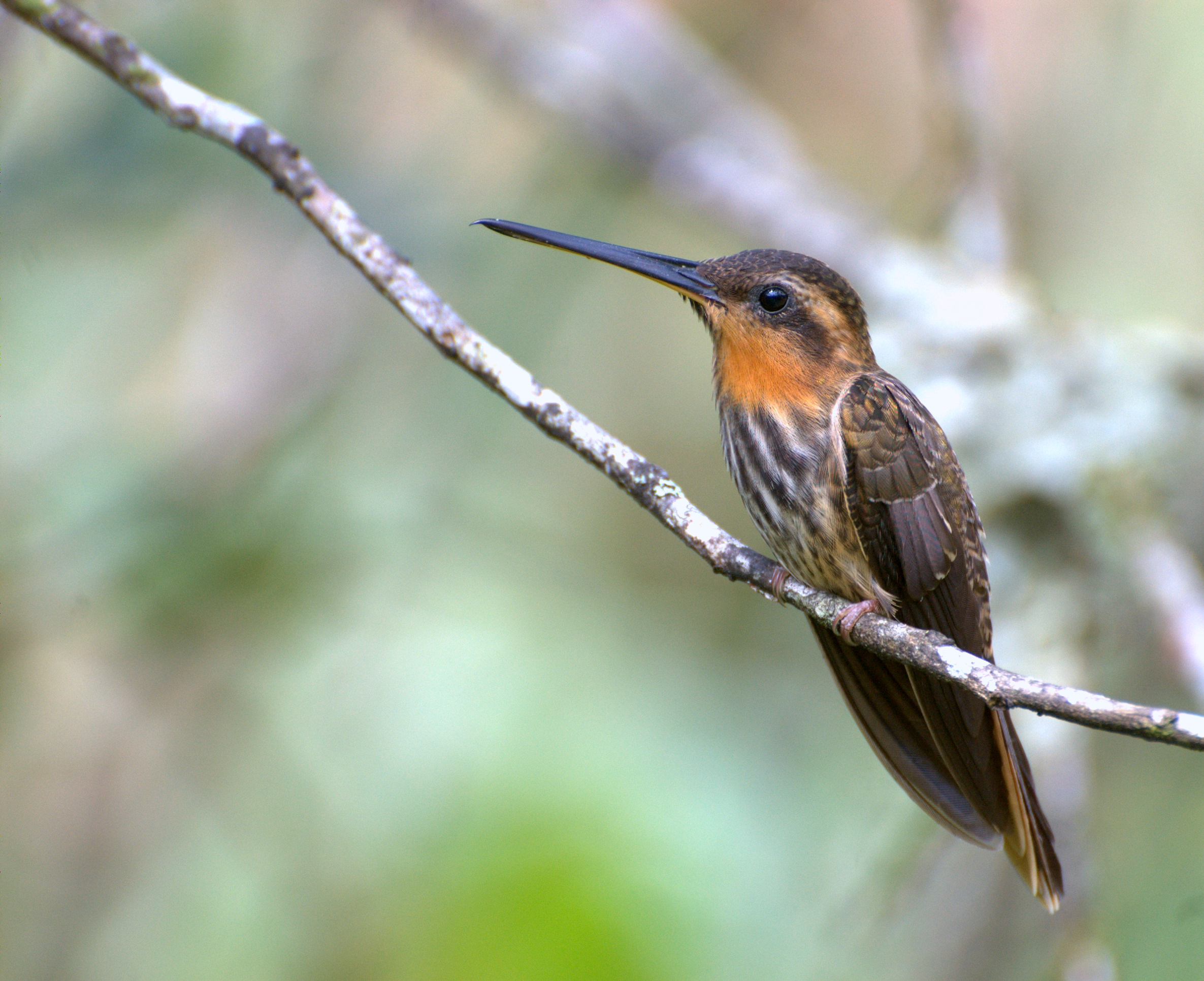

Conservation status
- Least Concern (IUCN 3.1)
- CITES Appendix II

Scientific classification
- Kingdom: Animalia
- Phylum: Chordata
- Class: Aves
- Order: Apodiformes
- Family: Trochilidae
- Subfamily: Phaethornithinae
- Genus: Ramphodon; Lesson, 1830
- Species: R. naevius

Binomial name
- Ramphodon naevius (Dumont, 1818)

Synonyms
- Trochilus naevius Dumont, 1818

= Saw-billed hermit =

Species of hummingbird

The saw-billed hermit (Ramphodon naevius) is a hummingbird in the family Trochilidae. It is endemic to Brazil.

== Taxonomy and systematics ==
The saw-billed hermit is placed in the hermit subfamily Phaethornithinae, but among these birds, it is the species most similar to the typical hummingbirds, Trochilinae. It is the only member of its genus and has no subspecies.

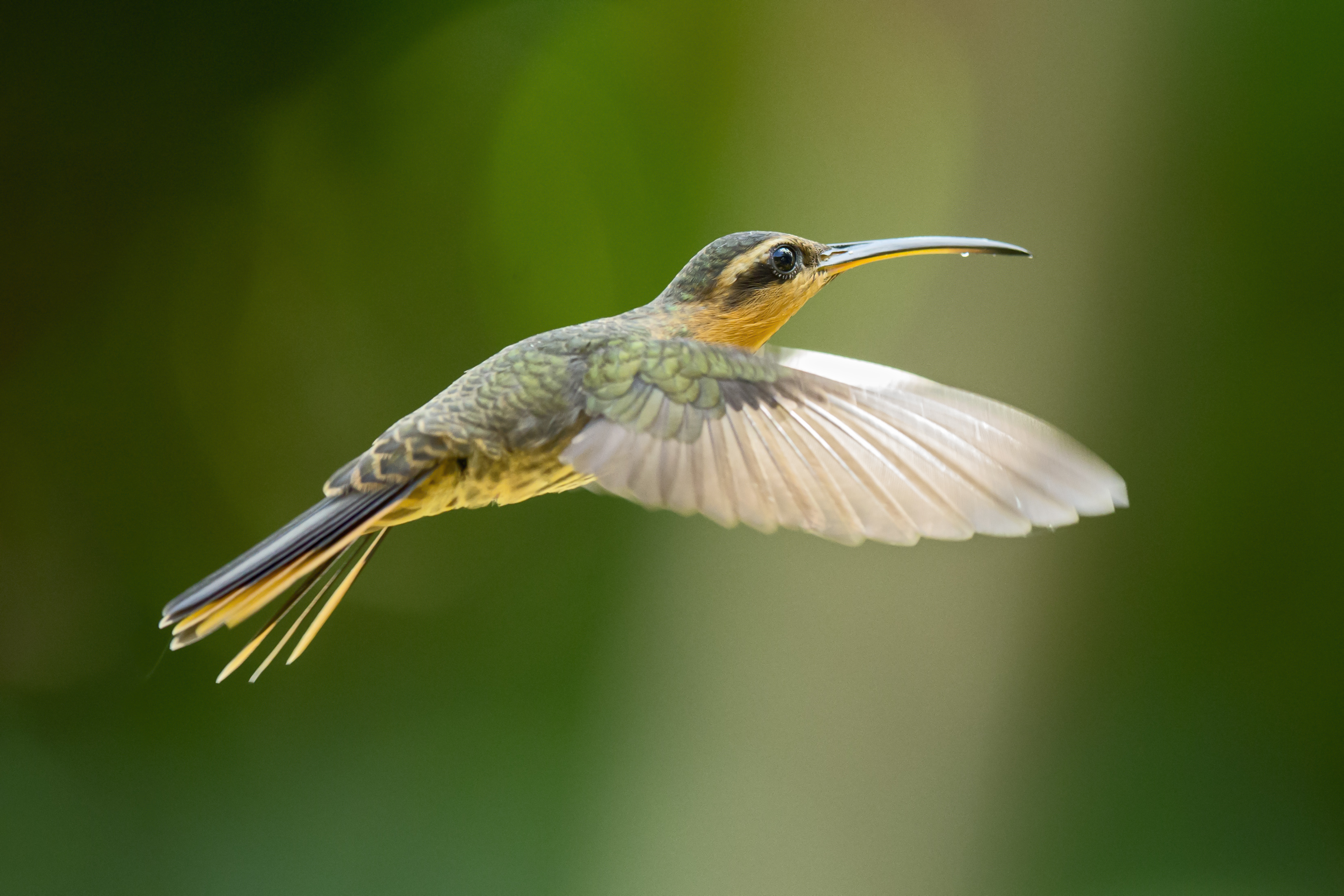

== Description ==
The saw-billed hermit is 14 to 16 cm (5.5 to 6.3 in) long and weighs 5.3 to 9 g (0.19 to 0.32 oz). It is one of the three heaviest hermits and the male is heavier than the female. Both sexes have saw-like serrations on the mandible and the male's bill has a hooked tip as well. (The unrelated tooth-billed hummingbird (Androdon aequatorialis) is the only other hummingbird that has a serrated bill.) Both sexes have scaly brown upperparts and dark and pale striped underparts. They have a reddish ochre throat, a dark patch through the eye, and a white supercilium. The upper side of the tail is purplish black while the underside has progressively more buff at the ends to the outer pair of feathers.

== Distribution and habitat ==
The saw-billed hermit is found in a narrow band of southeastern Brazil from the states of Minas Gerais and Espírito Santo south to eastern Santa Catarina and northernmost Rio Grande do Sul. It inhabits the understory of the humid coastal Atlantic Forest up to an elevation of 500 m (1,640 ft).

== Behavior ==
=== Movement ===
The saw-billed hermit is presumed to be sedentary, but there is speculation that it makes some short-range movements.

=== Feeding ===
The saw-billed hermit feeds on the nectar of a wide range of native and introduced flowering plants; most share the characteristic of tubular blossoms. It typically feeds within about 6 m (20 ft) of the ground but has been noted as high as 15 m (49 ft). Like other hermit hummingbirds it is a "trap-line" feeder, visiting a circuit of flowering plants. However, unlike many other trap-liners it defends its route by aggressive behavior towards conspecific and other hummingbirds. In addition to nectar, it feeds on small arthropods gleaned from vegetation.

=== Breeding ===
The saw-billed hermit's breeding season has not been fully defined but appears to include July to September. It builds its cone-shaped cup nest from plant material and cobwebs under the tip of a long drooping leaf. Its clutch is two eggs.

=== Vocalization ===
The saw-billed hermit's song is a "very high, chattering twitter". Calls include "a sustained, rapid series of very high 'bic' notes" and "a descending series...of 'seee' notes." The calls are apparently used while defending the trap-line.

== Status ==
The IUCN has assessed the saw-billed hermit as Least Concern. "[It] is suspected to be declining moderately rapidly owing to habitat loss."
