= Limonoid glucosyltransferase =

Enzyme that catalyzes the chemical reaction

limonoid glucosyltransferase

Identifiers
- EC no.: 2.4.1.210

Databases
- BRENDA: enzyme data
- ExPASy: NiceZyme view
- KEGG: enzyme entry
- MetaCyc: metabolic pathway
- Rhea: reactions
- PDB structures: RCSB PDB PDBe PDBsum
- Gene Ontology: AmiGO / QuickGO
Search
- PMC: articles
- PubMed: articles
- NCBI: proteins

In enzymology, a limonoid glucosyltransferase (EC 2.4.1.210) is an enzyme that catalyzes the chemical reaction.

UDP-glucose + limonin $\rightleftharpoons$ glucosyl-limonin + UDP

Thus, the two substrates of this enzyme are UDP-glucose and limonin, whereas its two products are glucosyl-limonin and UDP.

This enzyme belongs to the family of glycosyltransferases, specifically the hexosyltransferases. The systematic name of this enzyme class is uridine diphosphoglucose-limonoid glucosyltransferase.
