= Leucoperina kahli =

Scientific classification
- Kingdom: Animalia
- Phylum: Arthropoda
- Class: Insecta
- Order: Lepidoptera
- Superfamily: Noctuoidea
- Family: Erebidae
- Genus: Leucoperina
- Species: L. kahli

Binomial name
- Leucoperina kahli Holland, 1920

Synonyms
- Creaga batesi Bethune-Baker, 1927

Species of moth

Leucoperina kahli is a moth in the subfamily Lymantriinae. It was described by William Jacob Holland in 1920. It is found in Cameroon.

The wingspan is about 44 mm. Both wings are hyaline (glass like), the forewings grey or greyish white, with a dark spot in the angle of vein two. The hindwings are white and immaculate.
