= Furanolactone =

The chemical structure of salvinorin A.

A furanolactone is a heterocyclic chemical compound that contains both lactone and furan rings in its chemical structure.

Examples include:

- The salvinorins, including the hallucinogenic compound salvinorin A
- Columbin, a bitter diterpenoid from Calumbae Radix
- Limonoids such as limonin, nomilin, and nomilinic acid
- Tinosporide, a diterpenoid originally isolated from Tinospora cordifolia
