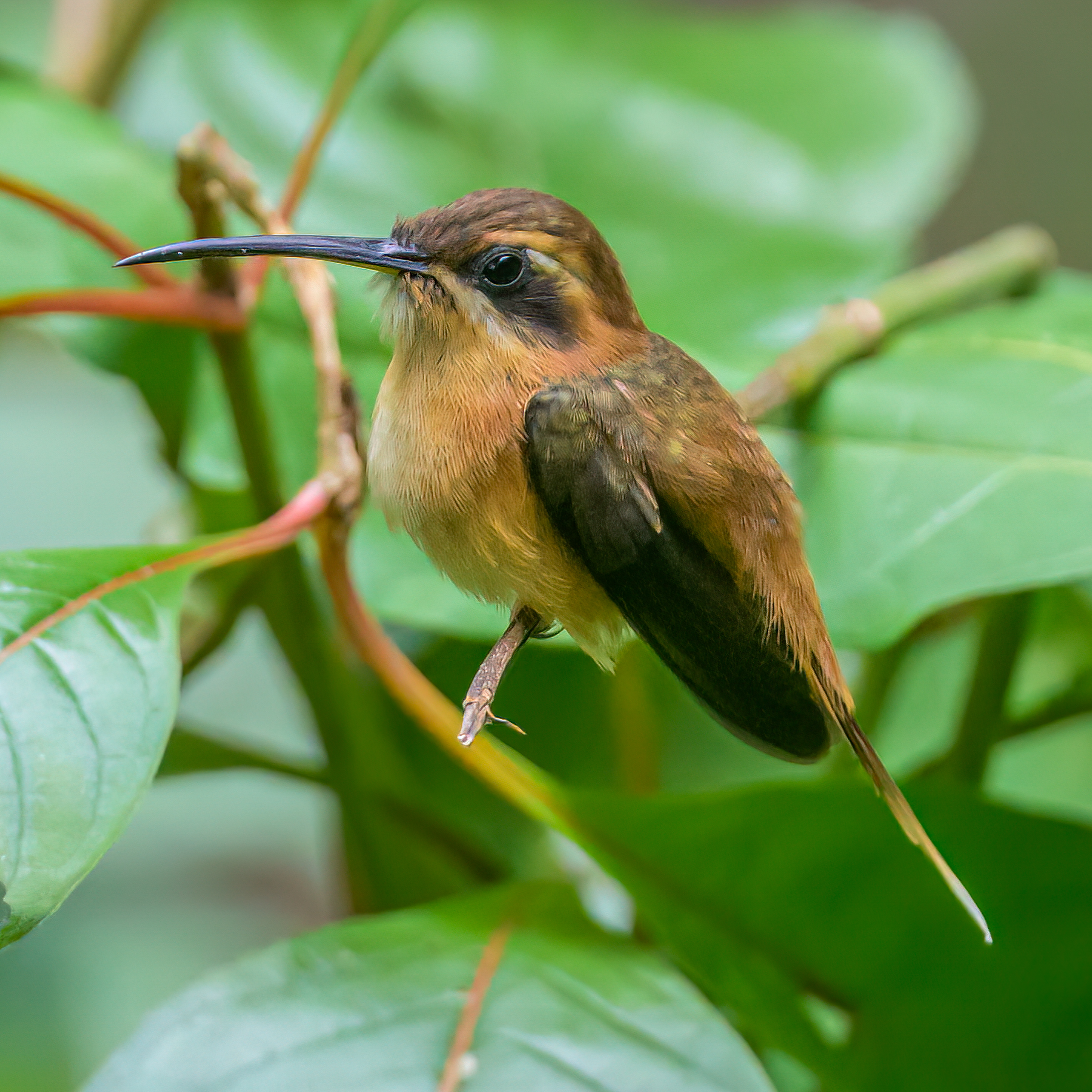

Conservation status
- Least Concern (IUCN 3.1)
- CITES Appendix II

Scientific classification
- Kingdom: Animalia
- Phylum: Chordata
- Class: Aves
- Order: Apodiformes
- Family: Trochilidae
- Genus: Phaethornis
- Species: P. striigularis

Binomial name
- Phaethornis striigularis Gould, 1854
- Range of P. striigularis

= Stripe-throated hermit =

Species of bird

The stripe-throated hermit (Phaethornis striigularis) is a species of hummingbird from Central America and north-western South America. It is generally fairly common and considered Least Concern by BirdLife International.

== Description and systematics ==
With a total length of 9–10 cm (3.5–3.9 in) and a weight of 2–3 g (0.071–0.106 oz), it is among the smaller species of hermits. The wing-coverts, mantle, nape and crown are dull iridescent green, the rump is pale rufous, the belly and flanks are buff, and the central underparts and throat are pale greyish brown, the latter with small dark streaks that often are faint and difficult to see. The face has a blackish "bandit-mask" border above by a whitish-buff supercilium and below by whitish-buff malar. The flight-feathers and tail are blackish; the latter tipped whitish to ochraceous depending on the subspecies involved. As in most other hermits, it has a long, decurved bill. The basal half of the lower mandible is yellow, but otherwise the entire bill is black.

The sexes are virtually identical. Juveniles apparently have the entire back pale rufous.

The male has a song which is high-pitched, squeaky, monotonous and easily overheard. Its exact structure varies over the species' range.

The stripe-throated hermit has, together with several other small hermits, often been considered a subspecies of the little hermit (P. longuemareus), but morphological data suggest it may be closer to the grey-chinned hermit (P. griseolaris). At present most, if not all, major authorities accept the split (SACC, the Clements check list, the Howard & Moore check list, etc.). It has been suggested that the mainly Central American taxon saturatus, which typically is considered a subspecies of P. striigularis, may deserve species status, in which case it would become the dusky hermit or Boucard's hermit (P. saturatus). The taxon adolphi is considered a junior synonym of saturatus by most authorities.

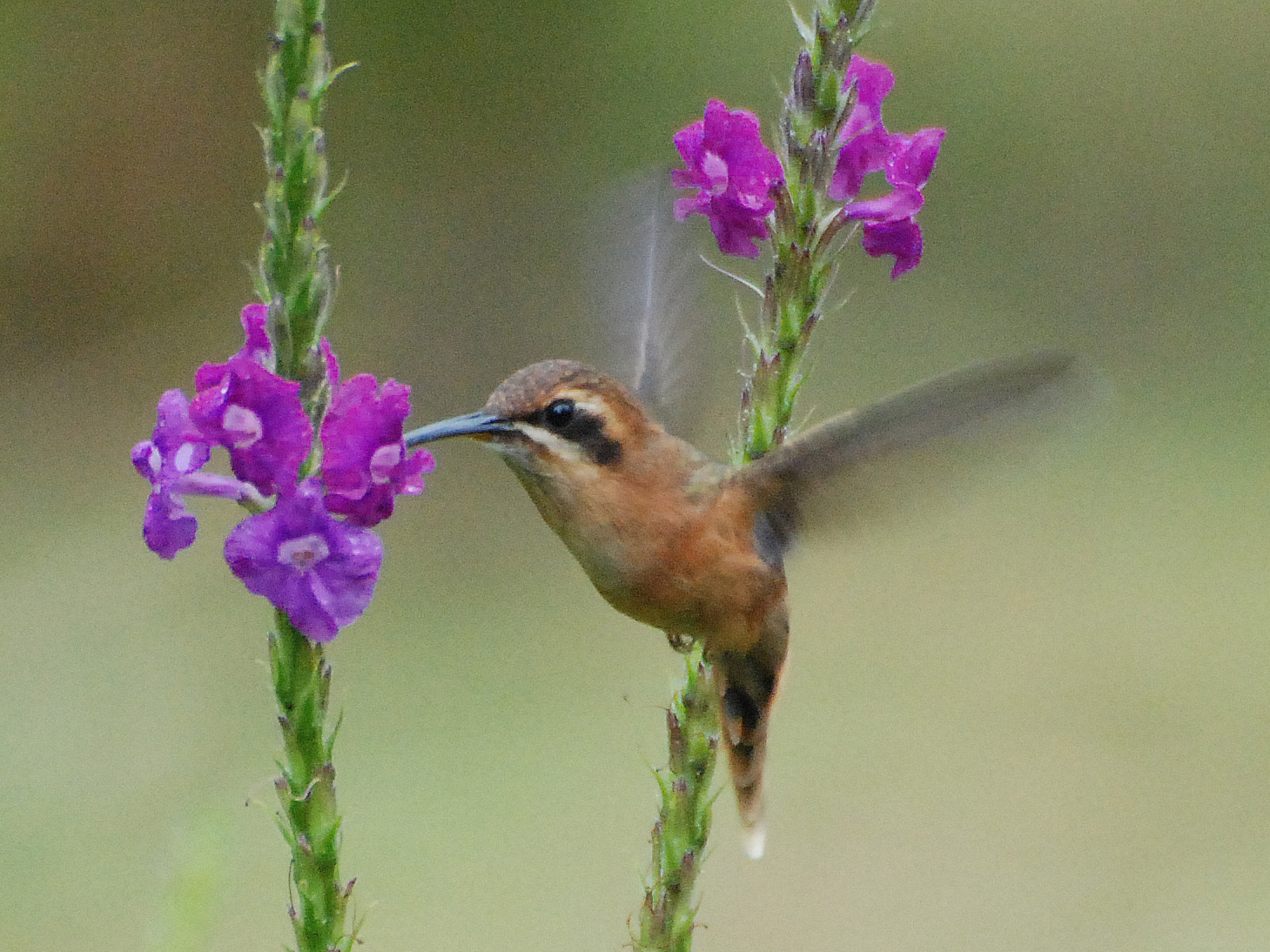
Phaethornis striigularis

== Distribution and ecology ==
It occurs in southern Mexico (north-eastern Oaxaca and southern Veracruz east to southern Quintana Roo), Belize, north-eastern Guatemala, northern and eastern Honduras, Nicaragua, Costa Rica, Panama, western, central and northern Colombia (mainly Pacific lowlands and the Magdalena valley region), western Ecuador (south to El Oro) and north-eastern Venezuela (both slopes of the Andes and northern mountains). As far as known, it is essentially a resident species, but some local movements may occur.

This hummingbird is found in a wide range of wooded habitats, e.g. forest, woodland, clearings, thickets and gardens; typically in humid regions, but locally also in drier, deciduous habitats (e.g. in Ecuador). Mainly found in lowlands and foothills, it has exceptionally been recorded up to an altitude of 1,800 m (5,900 ft) ASL.

The stripe-throated hermit feeds on flower-nectar taken by trap-lining. It has also been observed piercing the base of flowers to get nectar that otherwise would be out of reach; sometimes it take small insects. Typically this species forages fairly low, only occasionally at canopy-level.

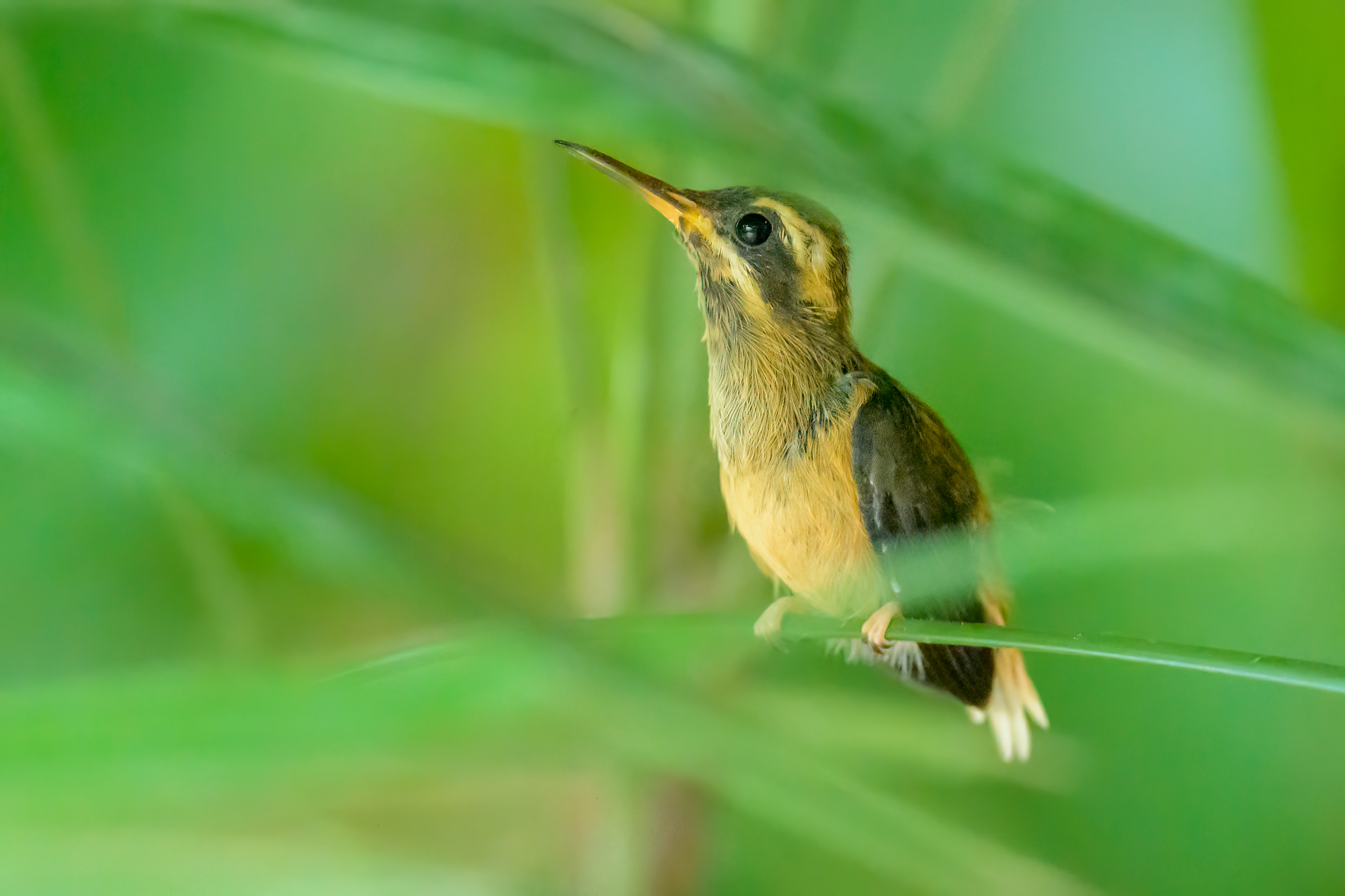
Juvenile at Selva Verde Lodge

It is essentially solitary, but males form leks where they sing to attract females. The nest, a small cup with a dangling "tail" below it, consists of plant-material held together by spiderwebs. The two eggs are incubated entirely by the female and hatch after 15–16 days. Exact timing of breeding varies depending on region; in Ecuador for example a dependent fledgling was seen in early March.
