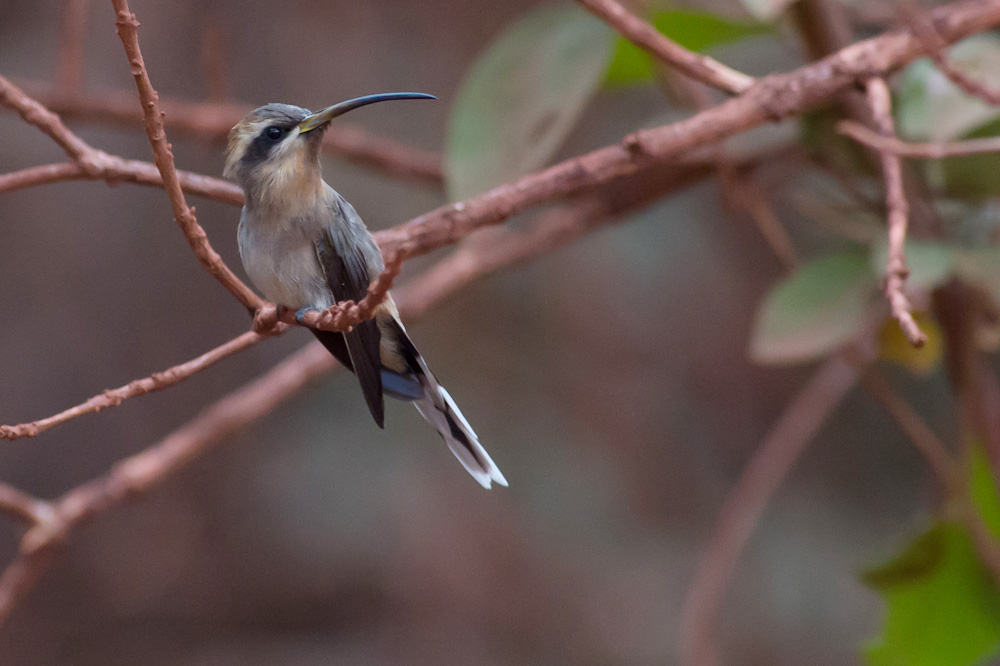

Conservation status
- Least Concern (IUCN 3.1)
- CITES Appendix II (CITES)

Scientific classification
- Kingdom: Animalia
- Phylum: Chordata
- Class: Aves
- Clade: Strisores
- Order: Apodiformes
- Family: Trochilidae
- Subfamily: Phaethornithinae
- Genus: Anopetia; Simon, 1918
- Species: A. gounellei

Binomial name
- Anopetia gounellei (Boucard, 1891)

Synonyms
- Phaethornis gounellei

= Broad-tipped hermit =

Species of hummingbird

The broad-tipped hermit (Anopetia gounellei) is a species of hummingbird in the family Trochilidae. It is endemic to Brazil.

== Taxonomy and systematics ==
The broad-tipped hermit was for a time placed in the very large genus Phaethornis. It is now placed in the monotypic genus Anopetia. It has no subspecies.

== Description ==
The broad-tipped hermit is about 11 to 12.6 cm (4.3 to 5.0 in) long and weighs about 2.6 to 3.4 g (0.092 to 0.12 oz). It is one of the smaller hermit hummingbirds. Its upperparts are bronzy green and its underparts mostly light brownish to ochraceous. It has a black "mask" and white supercilium and malar stripe. It It has a dark brown throat with an orangy border. Its name derives from its bill, whose maxilla is wide and overlaps the mandible. Its two inner pairs of tail feathers are longer than the others, and all have white tips. Unlike some other hermits, the male's and female's bills have similar curvature.

== Distribution and habitat ==
The broad-tipped hermit is found in northeastern Brazil, in an area roughly from Ceará south to western Bahia and northeastern Minas Gerais. It mostly inhabits somewhat humid caatinga landscapes with dense undergrowth beneath shrubs and trees, but also more open areas such as cerrado. In elevation it ranges from near sea level to about 1,200 m (3,900 ft).

== Behavior ==
=== Movement ===
The broad-tipped hermit is believed to be mostly sedentary, though some small seasonal movements have been observed.

=== Feeding ===
The broad-tipped hermit is thought to be a "trap-line" feeder, visiting a circuit of flowering plants. It feeds on nectar at a large variety of plants, and also on small arthropods.

=== Breeding ===
The broad-tipped hermit's nesting season has not been fully defined but appears to span at least December to February. The few described nests have been cups suspended beneath a leaf. The clutch size is two eggs. Males have been observed incubating the eggs. The species may display in leks.

=== Vocalization ===
The broad-tipped hermit's song is "a rising and falling bisyllablic series of notes 'si-lew' repeated continuously...[s]ometimes altered with a longer 'suweesi'."

== Status ==
The IUCN has assessed the broad-tipped hermit as being of Least Concern, though its population size and trend are unknown. It is "[p]resumably uncommon in general, although regularly seen...[and] occurs in a relatively unthreatened habitat."
