= Tinosporide =

Names
- IUPAC name (2S,4aR,6aR,7S,7aS,8aS,9S,9aS,9bS)-2-(3-Furanyl)dodecahydro-7-hydroxy-6a,9b-dimethyl-9,7-(epoxymethano)-4H-oxireno[6,7]naphtho[2,1-c]pyran-4,11-dione
- Other names 2,3-Epoxycolumbin; Jateorin; 5-(furan-3-yl)-12-hydroxy-3,11-dimethyl-6,14,16-trioxapentacyclo[10.3.2.0^{2,11}.0^{3,8}.0^{13,15}]heptadecane-7,17-dione

Identifiers
CAS Number	23369-74-6
3D model (JSmol)	Interactive image
ChemSpider	146649
PubChem CID	167631
- InChI: InChI=1S/C20H22O7/c1-18-7-11(9-4-6-24-8-9)25-16(21)10(18)3-5-19(2)14(18)12-13-15(26-13)20(19,23)17(22)27-12/h4,6,8,10-15,23H,3,5,7H2,1-2H3 Key: TXOMRNMZLZXJQP-UHFFFAOYSA-N
- SMILES: [H][C@@]12CC[C@]3(C)[C@@]([H])([C@@H]4OC(=O)[C@@]3(O)[C@H]3O[C@@H]43)[C@]1(C)C[C@H](OC2=O)C1=COC=C1

Properties
Chemical formula	C_{20}H_{22}O_{7}
Molar mass	374.389 g·mol^{−1}
- Except where otherwise noted, data are given for materials in their standard state (at 25 °C [77 °F], 100 kPa). Infobox references

Tinosporide is a chemical compound classified as a diterpenoid and a furanolactone. It was first isolated from the plant Tinospora cordifolia, from which it derives its name. It has since been found in other plants of the genus Tinospora, such as Tinospora glabra.

Because Tinospora cordifolia has been used in traditional herbal medicine, there has been research directed at exploring the potential pharmacology of tinosporide and related compounds.

== Related compounds ==
Other diterpenoid furanolactones with a similar structure include columbin, palmarin, and chasmanthin.

Columbin

Palmarin

Chasmanthin
