= Labordea prasina =

Scientific classification
- Domain: Eukaryota
- Kingdom: Animalia
- Phylum: Arthropoda
- Class: Insecta
- Order: Lepidoptera
- Superfamily: Noctuoidea
- Family: Erebidae
- Genus: Labordea
- Species: L. prasina

Binomial name
- Labordea prasina (Butler, 1882)

Synonyms
- Calliteara prasina Butler, 1882; Dasychira malgassica Hering, 1926; Lymantria nigrostriata Kenrick, 1914

Species of moth

Labordea prasina is a moth of the family Erebidae first described by Arthur Gardiner Butler in 1882. It is found in central Madagascar.

The wings of this species are pale green, the costal area bluer-green, divided by oblique snow-white dashes.

The male of this species has a wingspan of 30 mm. It was described by a specimen from Ankafana, central Madagascar.

== See also ==
- List of moths of Madagascar
