= Chisocheton erythrocarpus =

Conservation status
- Least Concern (IUCN 3.1)

Scientific classification
- Kingdom: Plantae
- Clade: Tracheophytes
- Clade: Angiosperms
- Clade: Eudicots
- Clade: Rosids
- Order: Sapindales
- Family: Meliaceae
- Genus: Chisocheton
- Species: C. erythrocarpus

Binomial name
- Chisocheton erythrocarpus Hiern

Species of tree

Chisocheton erythrocarpus is a tree in the family Meliaceae. The specific epithet erythrocarpus is from the Greek meaning 'red-fruited'.

== Description ==
The tree grows up to 40 metres (130 ft) tall with a trunk diameter of up to 40 centimetres (16 in). The bark is dark grey to chocolate brown. The flowers are creamy-white. The fruits are round, yellow (blood-red when ripe), up to 6 cm (2 in) in diameter.

== Distribution and habitat ==
Chisocheton erythrocarpus is found in Peninsular Malaysia, Borneo and the Philippines. The habitat is coastal forest.

== Phytochemicals ==
Eight previously unknown limonoids were identified via spectroscopy in the fruits of C. erythrocarpus gathered in Malaysia. These compounds were dubbed erythrocarpines after the species epithet.

The same study tested several preparations of C. erythrocarpus extract as larvicidal agent against Aedes aegypti mosquitoes; they found that 1000 ppm DCM extract resulted in 100% mortality of larva 24 hours after exposure.
