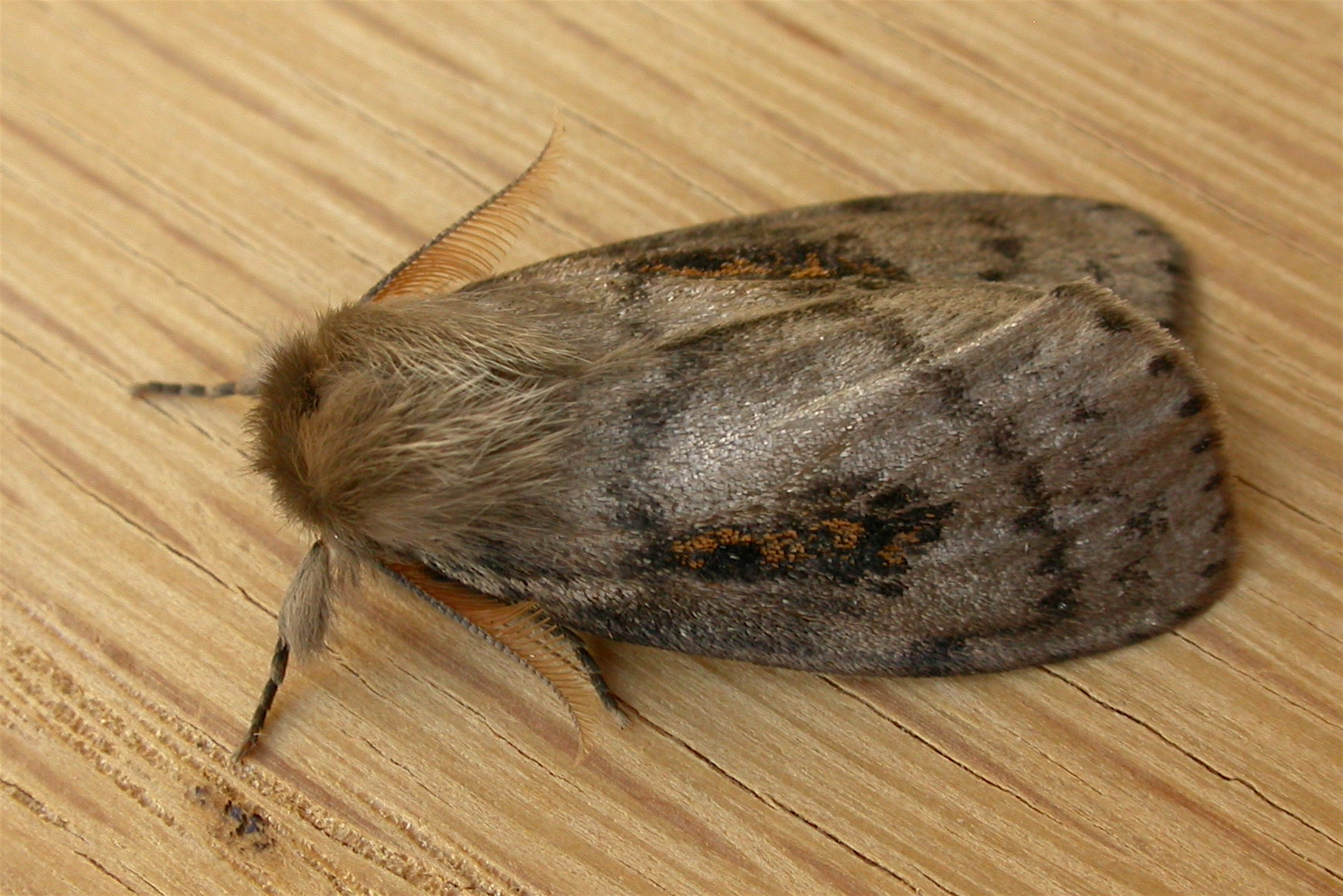

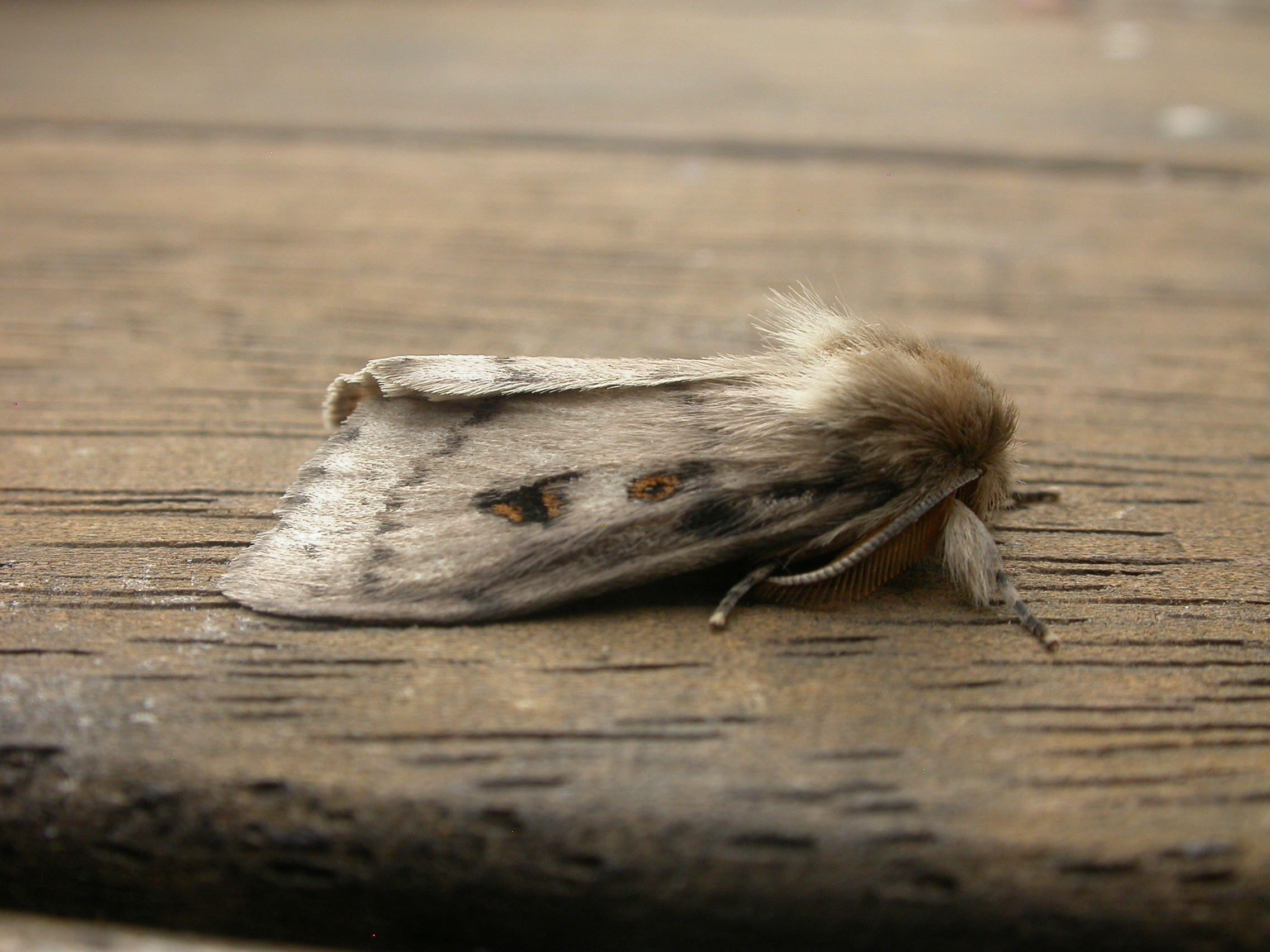

Scientific classification
- Kingdom: Animalia
- Phylum: Arthropoda
- Class: Insecta
- Order: Lepidoptera
- Superfamily: Noctuoidea
- Family: Erebidae
- Genus: Leptocneria
- Species: L. reducta

Binomial name
- Leptocneria reducta (Walker, 1855)

Synonyms
- Darala reducta Walker, 1855; Anthelymantria bistigmalis Strand, 1925; Anthela curanda Strand, 1929; Lymantria aurivillii Bryk, 1934; Lymantria aurivilli

= Leptocneria reducta =

Species of moth

Leptocneria reducta, the white cedar moth, is a moth of the subfamily Lymantriinae. The species was first described by Francis Walker in 1855. It is found in all of Australia, except Tasmania.

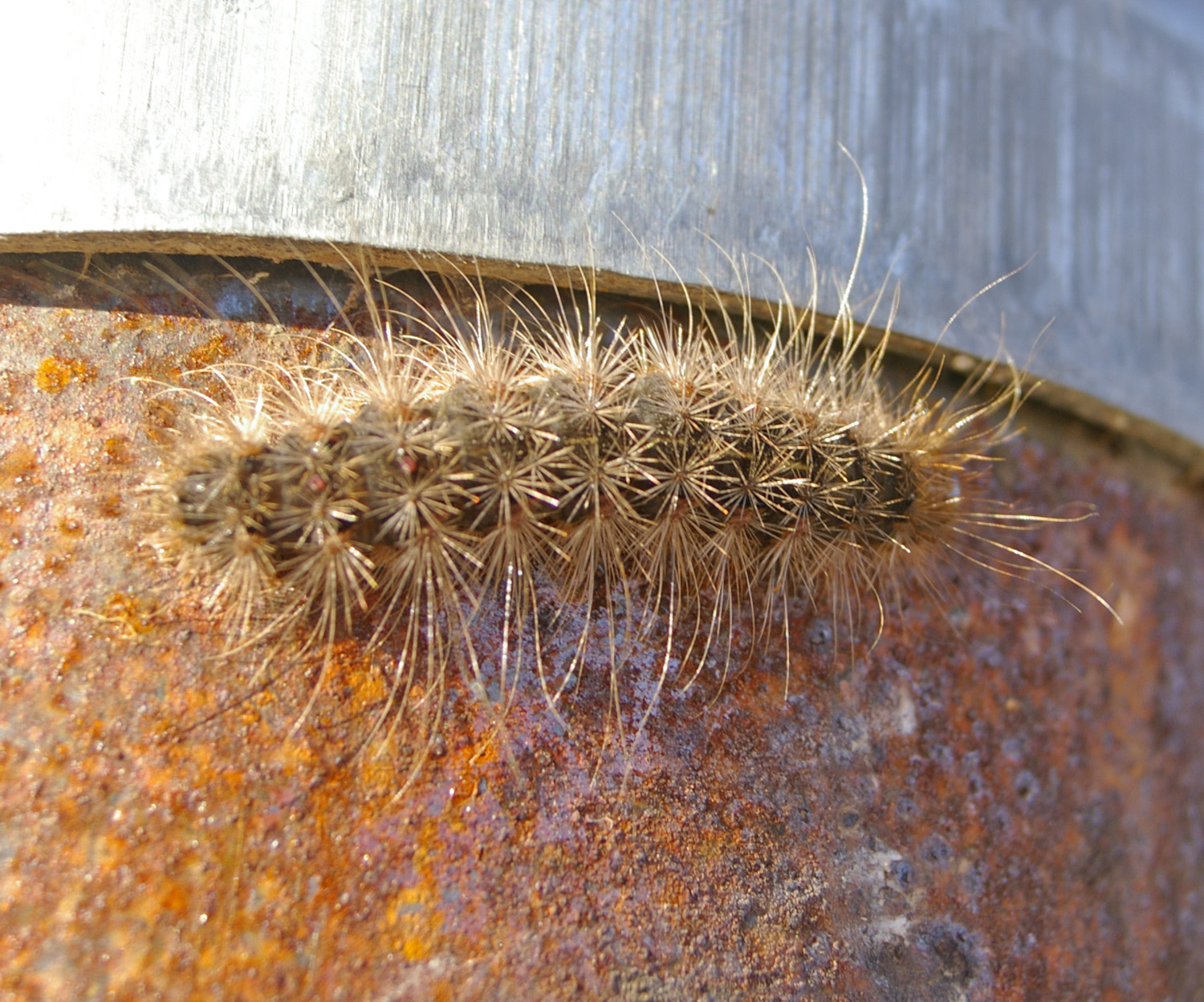
Larva

The wingspan is about 45 mm for females and 35 mm for males.

The larvae feed on Melia azedarach.
