= Leptepilepta umbrata =

Scientific classification
- Domain: Eukaryota
- Kingdom: Animalia
- Phylum: Arthropoda
- Class: Insecta
- Order: Lepidoptera
- Superfamily: Noctuoidea
- Family: Erebidae
- Genus: Leptepilepta
- Species: L. umbrata

Binomial name
- Leptepilepta umbrata Griveaud, 1973

Species of moth

Leptepilepta umbrata is a moth of the subfamily Lymantriinae. It is found in north-west Madagascar.

The male of this species has a wingspan of 33 mm. Head, front and are yellow, thorax straw yellow, antennae yellow and dark brown strongly pectinated, abdomen dirty yellow. The forewings are white, almost translucent, hindwings white, shaded grey.

The holotype was found near Ambanja, Sambirano River, Ankarafantsika National Park at an altitude of 250 m.
