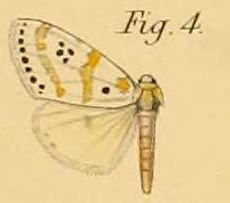
- Lacipa quadripunctata

Scientific classification
- Kingdom: Animalia
- Phylum: Arthropoda
- Class: Insecta
- Order: Lepidoptera
- Superfamily: Noctuoidea
- Family: Erebidae
- Tribe: Lymantriini
- Genus: Lacipa; Walker, 1855

Synonyms
- Microgymna Wallengren, 1865

= Lacipa =

Genus of moths

Lacipa is a genus of moths in the subfamily Lymantriinae. The genus was erected by Francis Walker in 1855.

== Species ==
- Lacipa argyroleuca Hampson, 1910 southern Nigeria
- Lacipa bizonoides Butler, 1894 Tanzania
- Lacipa compta Collenette, 1952 north-east Zimbabwe
- Lacipa croceigramma Hampson, 1910 northern Nigeria
- Lacipa elgonensis Collenette, 1952 Uganda
- Lacipa exetastes Collenette, 1952 Malawi
- Lacipa florida (Swinhoe, 1903) eastern Africa
- Lacipa flavitincta Hampson, 1910 eastern Africa
- Lacipa floridula (Hering, 1926) Tanzania
- Lacipa gemmatula Hering, 1926 Angola
- Lacipa gracilis Hopffer, 1862 eastern Africa
- Lacipa heterosticta Hampson, 1910 Uganda
- Lacipa impuncta Butler, 1898 eastern Africa
- Lacipa jefferyi (Collenette, 1931) Kenya
- Lacipa megalocera Collenette, 1952 Congo
- Lacipa melanosticta Hampson, 1910 Kenya
- Lacipa neavei Collenette, 1952 Malawi
- Lacipa nobilis (Herrich-Schäffer, [1855]) southern Africa
- Lacipa ostra (Swinhoe, 1903) eastern Africa
- Lacipa picta (Boisduval, 1847) Zimbabwe, southern Africa
- Lacipa pseudolacipa (Hering, 1926) Tanzania
- Lacipa pulverea Distant, 1898 southern Africa
- Lacipa quadripunctata Dewitz, 1881 southern Africa
- Lacipa rivularis (Gaede, 1916)
- Lacipa robusta Hering, 1926 Cameroon
- Lacipa sarcistis Hampson, 1905 southern Africa
- Lacipa sarcistoides Hering, 1926 Tanzania
- Lacipa subpunctata Bethune-Baker, 1911 Angola
- Lacipa sundara (Swinhoe, 1903) Uganda, eastern Africa
- Lacipa tau Collenette, 1931 Tanzania
- Lacipa xuthoma Collenette, 1936 Kenya
