= Labordea =

Scientific classification
- Domain: Eukaryota
- Kingdom: Animalia
- Phylum: Arthropoda
- Class: Insecta
- Order: Lepidoptera
- Superfamily: Noctuoidea
- Family: Erebidae
- Tribe: Lymantriini
- Genus: Labordea; Griveaud, 1976

Genus of moths

Labordea is a genus of moths in the subfamily Lymantriinae. The genus was erected by Paul Griveaud in 1976.

== Species ==
Some species of this genus are:

- Labordea chalcoptera (Collenette, 1936)
- Labordea hedilacea (Collenette, 1936)
- Labordea leucolineata Griveaud, 1977
- Labordea malgassica (Kenrick, 1914)
- Labordea marmor (Mabille, 1880)
- Labordea prasina (Butler, 1882)
- Labordea suarezi Griveaud, 1977
