= Lepidolacipa =

Scientific classification
- Domain: Eukaryota
- Kingdom: Animalia
- Phylum: Arthropoda
- Class: Insecta
- Order: Lepidoptera
- Superfamily: Noctuoidea
- Family: Erebidae
- Subfamily: Lymantriinae
- Genus: Lepidolacipa; Hering, 1926
- Species: L. venosata

Binomial name
- Lepidolacipa venosata Hering, 1926

Genus of moths

Lepidolacipa is a monotypic moth genus in the subfamily Lymantriinae. Its only species, Lepidolacipa venosata, is found in Malawi. Both the genus and the species were first described by Hering in 1926.
