= Laelaroa =

Scientific classification
- Domain: Eukaryota
- Kingdom: Animalia
- Phylum: Arthropoda
- Class: Insecta
- Order: Lepidoptera
- Superfamily: Noctuoidea
- Family: Erebidae
- Tribe: Lymantriini
- Genus: Laelaroa; Hering, 1926

Genus of moths

Laelaroa is a genus of moths in the subfamily Lymantriinae. The genus was erected by Hering in 1926. Both species are known from Nigeria.

== Species ==
- Laelaroa flavimargo Hering, 1926
- Laelaroa fulvicosta (Hampson, 1910
