= Limonoid =

Class of chemical compounds

Chemical structure of the prototypical limonoid limonin

Limonoids are phytochemicals of the triterpenoid class which are abundant in sweet or sour-scented citrus fruit and other plants of the families Cucurbitaceae, Rutaceae, and Meliaceae. Certain limonoids are antifeedants such as azadirachtin from the neem tree.

Chemically, the limonoids consist of variations of the furanolactone core structure. The prototypical structure consists of four six-membered rings and a furan ring. Limonoids are classed as tetranortriterpenes.

== Occurrence ==
Limonoids occur in the seeds of citrus plants, for example in grapefruit, lemon, orange, and mandarin, as well as in other species. They are present both as glucosides and in free form (i.e., as the aglycone). The quantitatively predominant glucoside is nomilinglucoside, whereas the most abundant free aglycone is limonin. Other compounds occurring both in free form and as glucosides include nomilic acid, obacunone, and deacetylnomiline. The glucosides account for approximately 0.31% to 0.87% of the dry weight of the seeds. Limonoids are also present in the leaves of the respective plants, which are therefore used in folk medicine as herbal infusions. Azadirachtin is a limonoid found in the seeds of Azadirachta indica and exhibits a strong insecticidal effect.

=== Citrus ===
Citrus fruits contain the limonoids limonin, nomilin, and nomilinic acid, while both neem seeds and leaves contain the limonoid azadirachtin, although higher concentrations are present in the former.

Structural formula of nomilin	Structural formula of nomilinic acid
Nomilin	Nomilinic acid

=== Chisocheton erythrocarpus ===
Eight previously unknown limonoids were identified via spectroscopy in the fruits of Chisocheton erythrocarpus gathered in Malaysia. These compounds were dubbed erythrocarpines after the species epithet. The same study tested several preparations of C. erythrocarpus extract as larvicidal agent against Aedes aegypti mosquitoes; they found that 1000 ppm of DCM extract resulted in 100% mortality of larva 24 hours after exposure.

== Pharmacological effects ==
Numerous potential applications of limonoids have been investigated. Early research attributed strong antioxidant activity to these compounds. However, subsequent studies refuted this assumption. In fact, the total antioxidant capacity (TAC) of limonoids is significantly lower than that of established antioxidants such as ascorbic acid or butylhydroxytoluene (BHT). Of greater importance is the physiological activity of limonoids. They have demonstrated antipyretic, antibacterial, and antiviral effects. They have also been successfully applied in the treatment of malaria. Furthermore, their potential as anticarcinogenic agents has been investigated in breast, colon, pancreatic, and liver cancer, as well as in leukemia. In addition, certain limonoids have been shown to reduce cholesterol release and thus exhibit antiatherogenic properties.

== Undesirable effects ==
Limonoids may present challenges in fruit juice production. In particular, the removal of the bitter compound limonin is necessary to improve the sensory quality of the juices.

== See also ==
- Tetranortriterpenoid
