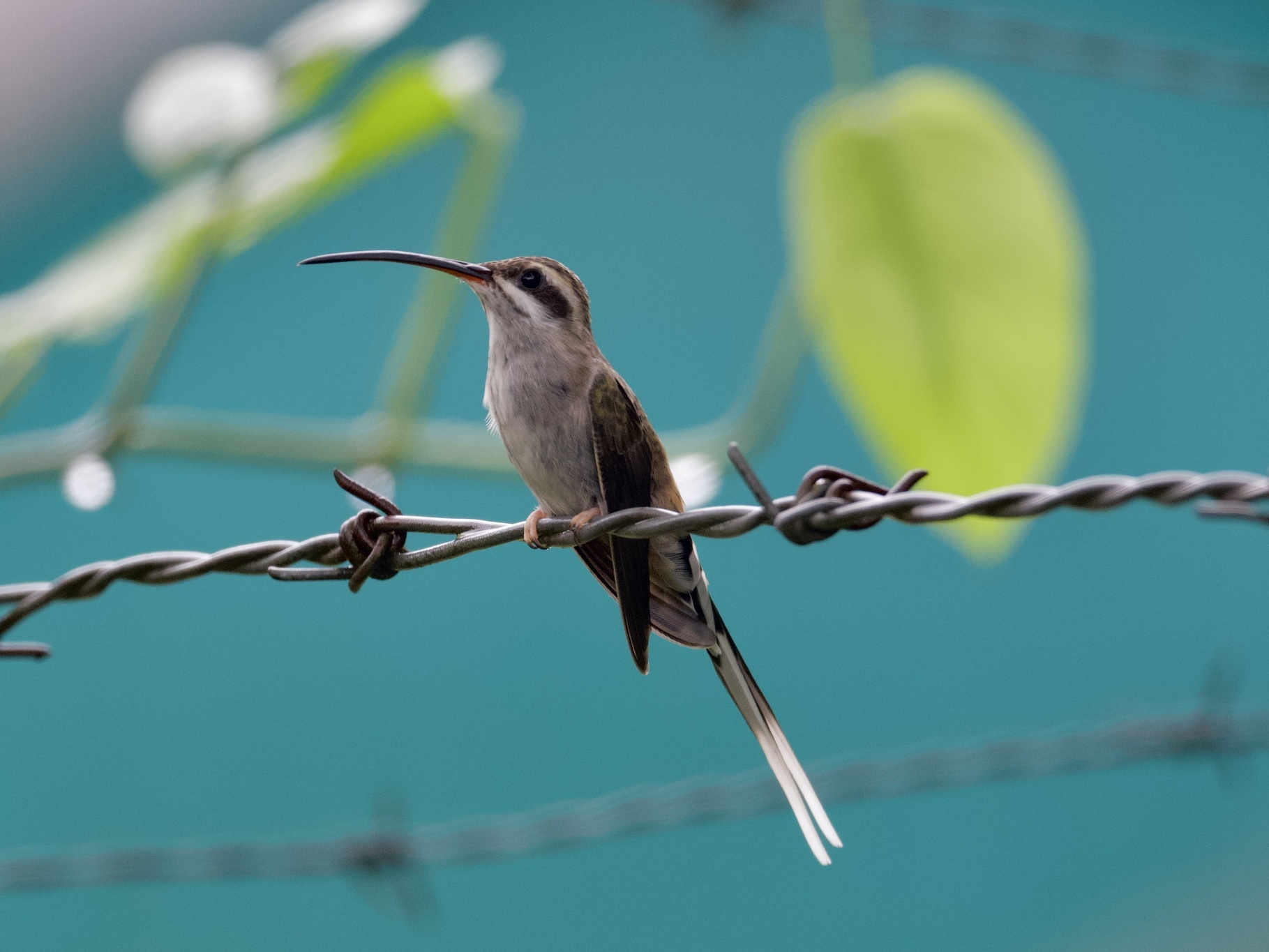

Conservation status
- Least Concern (IUCN 3.1)
- CITES Appendix II (CITES)

Scientific classification
- Kingdom: Animalia
- Phylum: Chordata
- Class: Aves
- Clade: Strisores
- Order: Apodiformes
- Family: Trochilidae
- Genus: Phaethornis
- Species: P. augusti

Binomial name
- Phaethornis augusti (Bourcier, 1847)

= Sooty-capped hermit =

Species of hummingbird

The sooty-capped hermit (Phaethornis augusti) is a species of bird in the family Trochilidae, the hummingbirds. It is found in Brazil, Colombia, French Guiana, Guyana, Suriname, and Venezuela.

== Taxonomy and systematics ==
The sooty-capped hermit is closely related to the planalto hermit (P. pretrei) and may form a superspecies with it. Three subspecies of sooty-capped hermit are recognized, the nominate P. a. augusti, P. a. curiosus, and P. a incanescens. A fourth proposed subspecies P. a. vicarius, in the Colombian Andes, cannot be separated from the nominate.

== Description ==
The sooty-capped hermit is about 14 to 15 cm (5.5 to 5.9 in) long. Males weigh 4.5 to 6 g (0.16 to 0.21 oz) and females 4 to 5 g (0.14 to 0.18 oz). They are mostly grayish brown above with a rufous rump and uppertail coverts. The next-to-inner tail feathers are longer than the others and all have white tips. Their underparts are gray. The face has a black "mask" with a white supercilium and gular stripe. The subspecies differ slightly in the intensity of the breast and uppertail covert colors and the size of the gular stripe. What was once thought to be a separate species P. fumosus was determined to be a melanistic morph of the nominate sooty-capped hermit.

== Distribution and habitat ==
Major taxonomic systems place the nominate subspecies of sooty-capped hermit in Venezuela's Coastal Range and eastern Andes and south on the eastern slope of Colombia's Eastern Andes; P. a. curiosus in the isolated Sierra Nevada de Santa Marta of northeastern Colombia; and P. a incanescens on the tepuis of southern Venezuela, western Guyana, and Brazil's Roraima state. The South American Classification Committee (SACC) of the American Ornithological Society places the species in those four countries and also French Guiana and Suriname.

== Behavior ==
=== Movement ===
The sooty-capped hermit is thought to be mostly sedentary, but some seasonal vertical movement has been documented.

=== Feeding ===
The sooty-capped hermit is a "trap-line" feeder like other hermit hummingbirds, visiting a circuit of flowering plants for nectar. It also consumes small arthropods, and has been observed catching them in buildings.

=== Breeding ===
Active nests of the sooty-capped hermit have been found in Venezuela between February and July and also between September and December. The nest is a cone-shaped cup; a typical one was made of moss and spider web with pieces of dried mud on the outer wall. It was suspended by a single stout cable of spider silk from a nail in a storehouse. Nests may be reused multiple times within a season. The clutch size is two eggs.

=== Vocalization ===
The sooty-capped hermit's song is "a continuously repeated phrase consisting of 2–3 high notes followed by 2–3 somewhat lower ones, e.g. 'tsee-tsee-tsee-sew-sew....tsee-tsee-tsee-sew-sew...'." The male sings from a perch at a lek while wagging its tail. It also makes a "rather monotonous 'tseet'" call.

== Status ==
The IUCN has assessed the sooty-capped hermit as being of Least Concern; though its population size is unknown it is believed to be stable. It is considered locally uncommon to common and seems "to adapt well to habitats modified by man".
