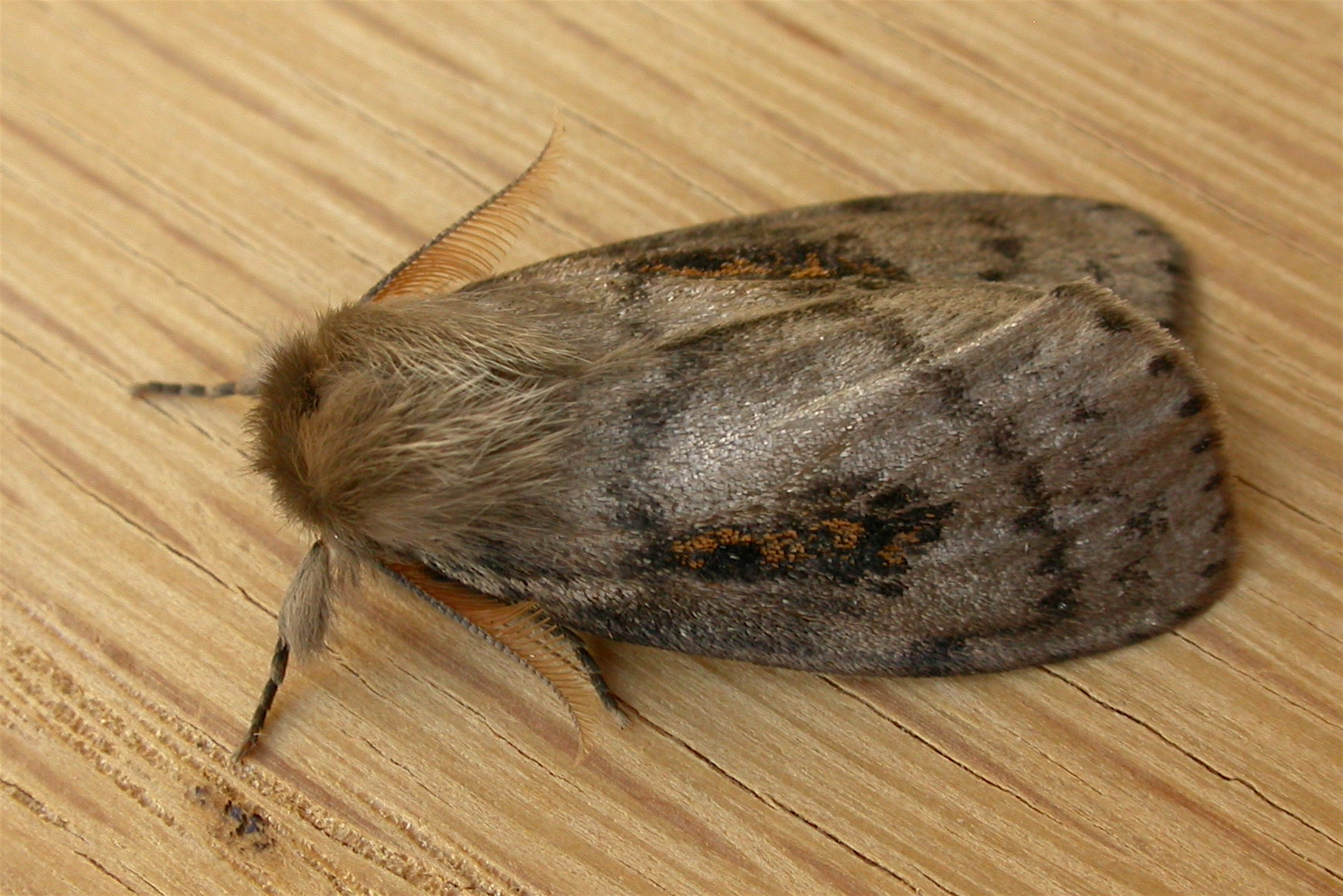

Scientific classification
- Kingdom: Animalia
- Phylum: Arthropoda
- Clade: Pancrustacea
- Class: Insecta
- Order: Lepidoptera
- Superfamily: Noctuoidea
- Family: Erebidae
- Tribe: Lymantriini
- Genus: Leptocneria; Butler, 1886

Synonyms
- Anthelymantria Strand, 1925

= Leptocneria =

Genus of moths

Leptocneria is a genus of moths in the subfamily Lymantriinae erected by Arthur Gardiner Butler in 1886. The wings of the moth are generally dark brown, with some variations containing a medley of dark and light hues.

== Species ==
- Leptocneria reducta
- Leptocneria binotata
- Leptocneria vinarskii
