= Laelioproctis =

Scientific classification
- Kingdom: Animalia
- Phylum: Arthropoda
- Clade: Pancrustacea
- Class: Insecta
- Order: Lepidoptera
- Superfamily: Noctuoidea
- Family: Erebidae
- Subfamily: Lymantriinae
- Genus: Laelioproctis; Hering, 1926

Genus of moths

Laelioproctis leucosphena

Laelioproctis is a genus of moths in the subfamily Lymantriinae. The genus was described by Hering in 1926.

== Species ==
- Laelioproctis leucosphena Collenette, 1939 south-western Africa
- Laelioproctis taeniosoma Hering, 1926 Togo
- Laelioproctis thysanota Collenette, 1960 Kenya
