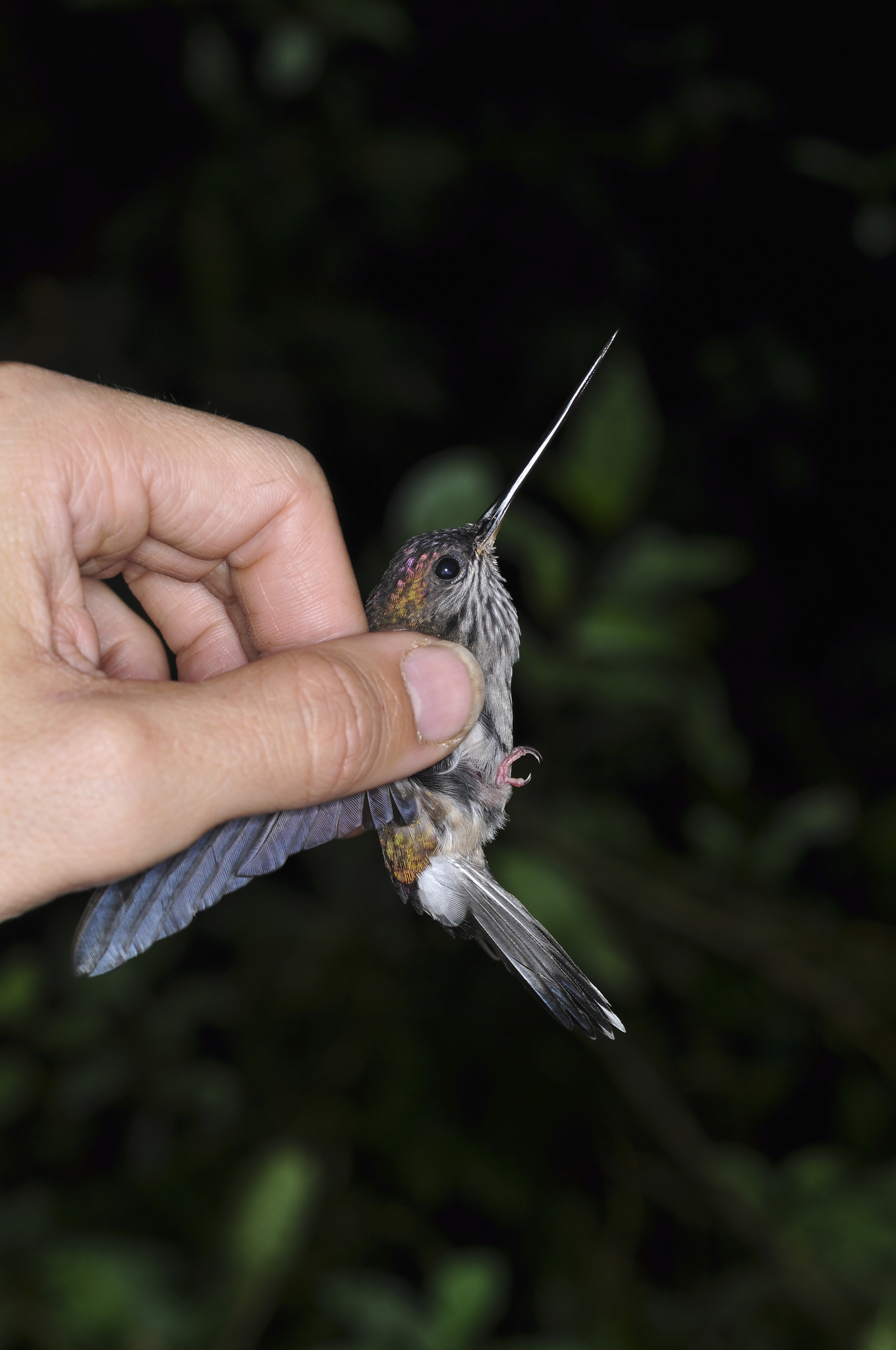

Conservation status
- Least Concern (IUCN 3.1)
- CITES Appendix II

Scientific classification
- Kingdom: Animalia
- Phylum: Chordata
- Class: Aves
- Order: Apodiformes
- Family: Trochilidae
- Subfamily: Polytminae
- Genus: Androdon; Gould, 1863
- Species: A. aequatorialis

Binomial name
- Androdon aequatorialis Gould, 1863

= Tooth-billed hummingbird =

Species of bird

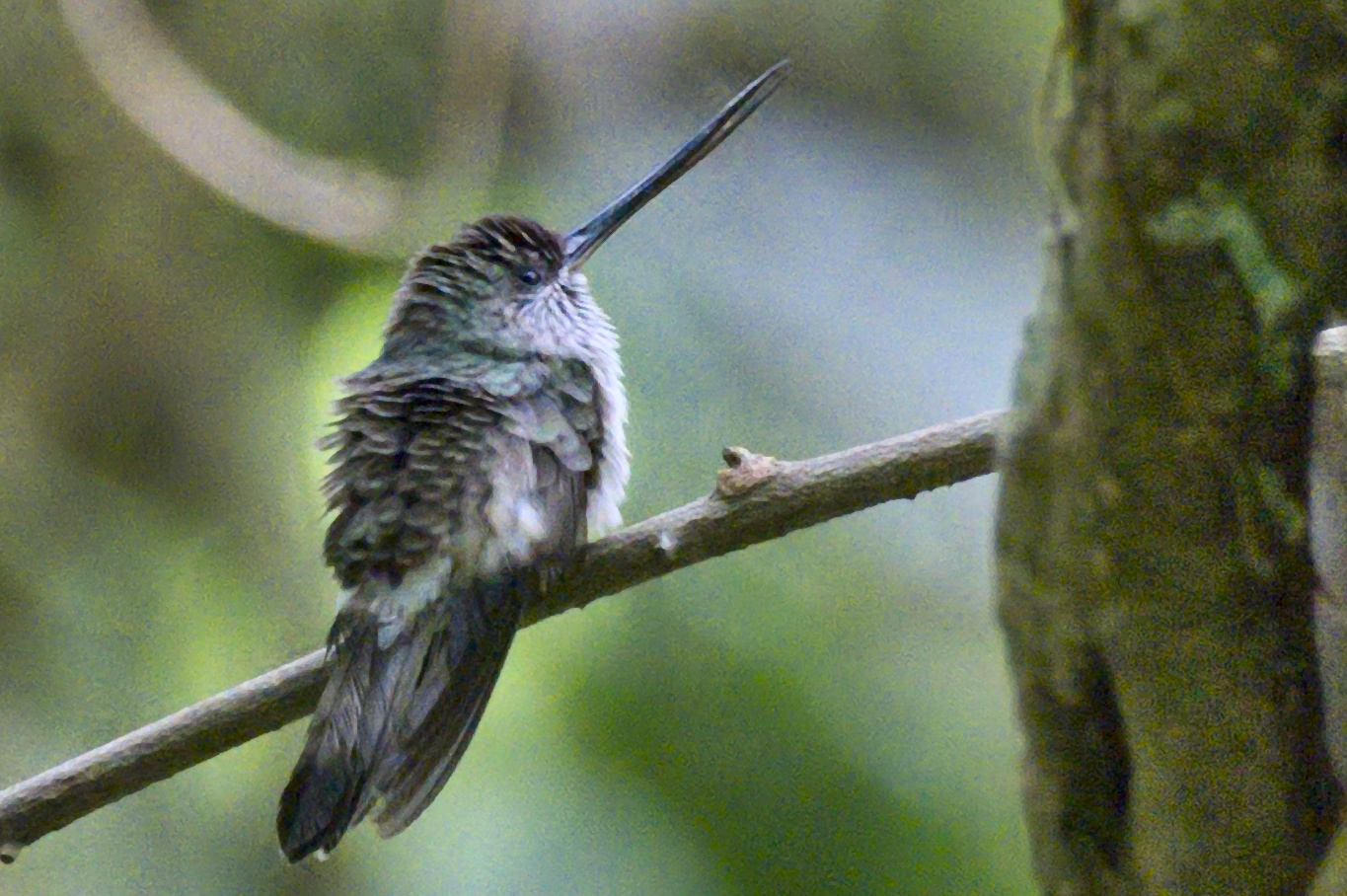
Tooth-billed hummingbird

The tooth-billed hummingbird (Androdon aequatorialis) is a species of bird from the family Trochilidae. It is monotypic within the genus Androdon. It is found in humid forests in western Colombia, north-western Ecuador (south to Pichincha Province), and far eastern Panama (Darién Province). While generally scarce, localized and associated with the highly threatened humid sections of the Chocó, its range remains relatively large, and it is therefore considered to be of least concern by BirdLife International.

== Description ==
The tooth-billed hummingbird has a total length of c. 14 cm (5 1/2 in), which includes the long, essentially straight bill of c. 4 cm (1 1/2 in). Its common name refers to the small tooth-like serrations on the inner part of the distal half of the bill. It is shiny green above with a coppery crown. The underparts are whitish streaked dusky. The rounded tail is greyish with a broad black subterminal band and white tips. There is a conspicuous white band on the rump. In males, the bill has a small hook at the tip and more prominent tooth-like spikes; their plumage color averages brighter overall than females. While the green upper parts of this species are iridescent, its plumage is duller than that of most hummingbirds. Within its range, it is essentially unmistakable by the combination of the long, almost straight bill and the dark-streaked whitish underparts.

== Habitat ==
The tooth-billed hummingbird is restricted to humid primary forests and nearby second growth. It occurs up to an altitude of c. 1,560 m (5,120 ft). In Ecuador, it is most frequent between 400–800 m (1,300–2,600 ft), while it mainly occurs between 600–1,560 m (1,970–5,120 ft) in Panama, and up to 1,050 m (3,440 ft) in Colombia.

== Behavior ==
Rather inconspicuous and generally poorly known. It is a swift flier. It forages from low levels to sub-canopy, where it feeds on nectar from flowers of plant families such Ericaceae and Gesneriaceae. Its main feeding strategy involves trap-lining. The serrated bill is also well adapted for catching small spiders and insects, while the hooked tip of the males' bill is further suited for extracting prey from within rolled leaves and cavities. It has sometimes been seen rapidly gleaning below large leaves, while flicking its tail.

Little is known about its breeding behavior, but individuals captured in Colombia in January–March have had enlarged gonads, indicating that they were in breeding condition. In Ecuador, it has been reported that males gather in leks in February–May, which is unusual among members of the subfamily Trochilinae, but frequent among the members of Phaethornithinae. Its calls include a high-pitches tsit-tseé-tsu and penetrating cheet notes.

== Taxonomy ==
The tooth-billed hummingbird's taxonomic position has been controversial, with some arguing that it should be placed in the subfamily Phaethornithinae, and others that it, together with the two lancebills, should be placed in their own small subfamily, Doryferinae. Today most authorities place it at the beginning of Trochilinae.
