= Lanitra =

Scientific classification
- Domain: Eukaryota
- Kingdom: Animalia
- Phylum: Arthropoda
- Class: Insecta
- Order: Lepidoptera
- Superfamily: Noctuoidea
- Family: Erebidae
- Subfamily: Lymantriinae
- Genus: Lanitra; Griveaud, 1976
- Species: L. hexamitobalia

Binomial name
- Lanitra hexamitobalia (Collenette, 1936)

Synonyms
- Dasychira hexamitobalia Collenette, 1936

Genus of moths

Lanitra is a monotypic moth genus in the subfamily Lymantriinae erected by Paul Griveaud in 1976. Its only species, Lanitra hexamitobalia, was first described by Cyril Leslie Collenette in 1936. It is found on Madagascar.
