= Lymantriades =

Scientific classification
- Kingdom: Animalia
- Phylum: Arthropoda
- Class: Insecta
- Order: Lepidoptera
- Superfamily: Noctuoidea
- Family: Erebidae
- Subfamily: Lymantriinae
- Genus: Lymantriades; Bethune-Baker, 1911

Genus of moths

Lymantriades is a genus of moths in the subfamily Lymantriinae. The genus was erected by George Thomas Bethune-Baker in 1911.

== Species ==
- Lymantriades obliqualinea Bethune-Baker, 1911 Angola
- Lymantriades xanthosoma (Hampson, 1910) Sudan
