= Lomadonta =

Scientific classification
- Domain: Eukaryota
- Kingdom: Animalia
- Phylum: Arthropoda
- Class: Insecta
- Order: Lepidoptera
- Superfamily: Noctuoidea
- Family: Erebidae
- Subfamily: Lymantriinae
- Genus: Lomadonta; Holland, 1893

Genus of moths

Lomadonta is a genus of moths in the subfamily Lymantriinae. The genus was erected by William Jacob Holland in 1893.

== Species ==
- Lomadonta aurago Schultze, 1934 Cameroon
- Lomadonta callipepla Collenette, 1961 Congo
- Lomadonta citrago Hering, 1926
- Lomadonta erythrina Holland, 1893 western Africa
- Lomadonta hoesemanni Bryk, 1913 western Africa
- Lomadonta obscura Swinhoe, 1904 western Africa
- Lomadonta saturata Swinhoe, 1904 southern Nigeria
- Lomadonta siccifolium Schultze, 1934 western Africa
- Lomadonta umbrata Bryk, 1913 western Africa
