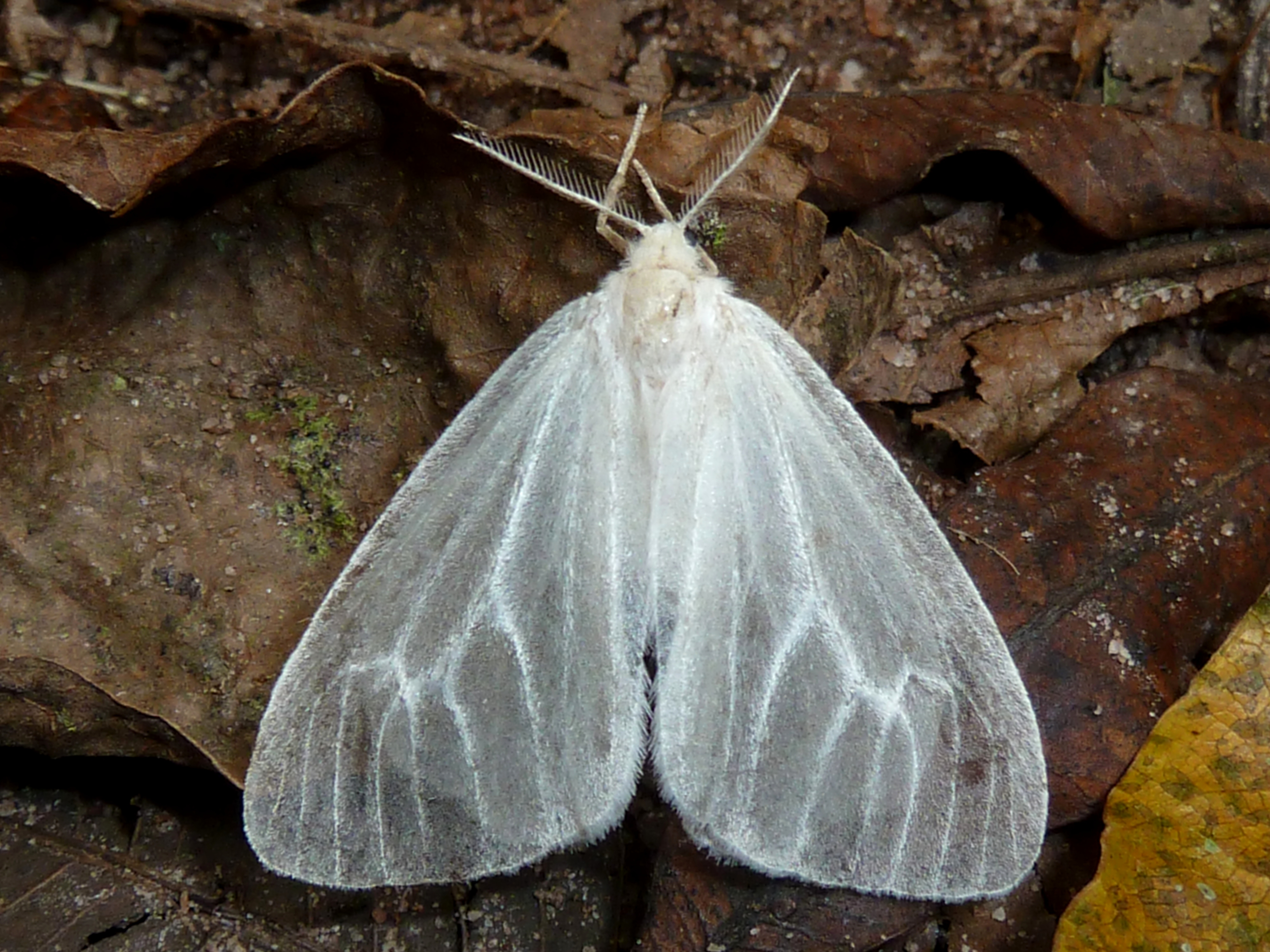
- Lepidopalpus hyalina

Scientific classification
- Domain: Eukaryota
- Kingdom: Animalia
- Phylum: Arthropoda
- Class: Insecta
- Order: Lepidoptera
- Superfamily: Noctuoidea
- Family: Erebidae
- Subfamily: Lymantriinae
- Genus: Lepidopalpus; Janse, 1915
- Species: L. hyalina

Binomial name
- Lepidopalpus hyalina Janse, 1915

= Lepidopalpus =

Genus of moths

Lepidopalpus is a monotypic moth genus in the subfamily Lymantriinae. Its only species, Lepidopalpus hyalina, is found in southern Africa. Both the genus and the species were first described by Anthonie Johannes Theodorus Janse in 1915.
