= Leucoperina =

Scientific classification
- Kingdom: Animalia
- Phylum: Arthropoda
- Class: Insecta
- Order: Lepidoptera
- Superfamily: Noctuoidea
- Family: Erebidae
- Tribe: Lymantriini
- Genus: Leucoperina; Aurivillius, 1909

Synonyms
- Syntaxis Hering, 1926

Genus of moths

Leucoperina is a genus of moths in the subfamily Lymantriinae. The genus was erected by Per Olof Christopher Aurivillius in 1909.

== Species ==
- Leucoperina atroguttata Aurivillius, 1909
- Leucoperina kahli Holland, 1920
