= Leptepilepta =

Scientific classification
- Domain: Eukaryota
- Kingdom: Animalia
- Phylum: Arthropoda
- Class: Insecta
- Order: Lepidoptera
- Superfamily: Noctuoidea
- Family: Erebidae
- Tribe: Lymantriini
- Genus: Leptepilepta; Collenette, 1929

Genus of moths

Leptepilepta is a genus of moths in the subfamily Lymantriinae. The genus was erected by Cyril Leslie Collenette in 1929.

== Species ==
- Leptepilepta betschi Griveaud, 1977
- Leptepilepta diaphanella (Mabille, 1897)
- Leptepilepta umbrata (Griveaud, 1973)
