= Tetranortriterpenoid =

Class of organic compounds

The tetranortriterpenoid class of naturally occurring organic compounds, of which the most noted compound is azadirachtin, extracted from the neem tree (Azadirachta indica) that displays insecticidal properties. Azadirachtin mimics insect hormones called ecdysones that regulate the pupation of insects; application of azadirachtin interrupts the development and pupation of insects, eventually killing them.

The name indicates that the basic skeleton of such compounds contains 26 carbon atoms (4 fewer than triterpenes).

Azadirachtin is a tetranortriterpenoid and a limonoid.
