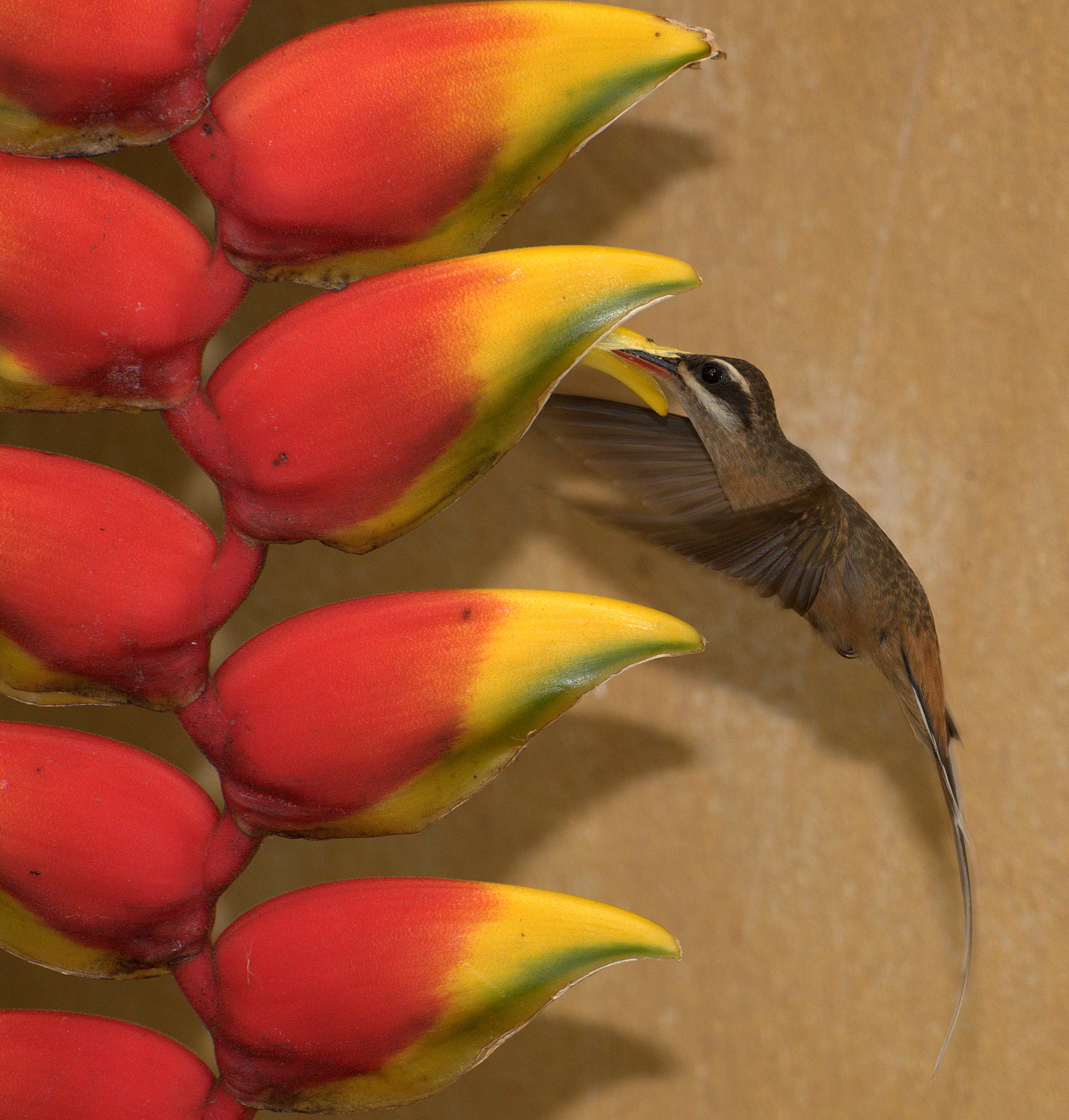

Conservation status
- Least Concern (IUCN 3.1)
- CITES Appendix II

Scientific classification
- Kingdom: Animalia
- Phylum: Chordata
- Class: Aves
- Order: Apodiformes
- Family: Trochilidae
- Genus: Phaethornis
- Species: P. pretrei

Binomial name
- Phaethornis pretrei (Lesson, RP & Delattre, 1839)

= Planalto hermit =

Species of hummingbird

The planalto hermit (Phaethornis pretrei) is a species of hummingbird. It is found in Argentina, Bolivia, Brazil, Paraguay, and Peru.

== Taxonomy and systematics ==
At one time, the planalto hermit was suggested to belong to a monotypic genus Anisoterus but this treatment was quickly rejected. It is closely related to the sooty-capped hermit (P. augusti) and may form a superspecies with it. It has no recognized subspecies, but several that have been proposed have been shown to be based on aberrant specimens or individual variation.

== Description ==
The planalto hermit is about 14 to 16.5 cm (5.5 to 6.5 in) long. Males weigh 4.5 to 7 g (0.16 to 0.25 oz) and females 3 to 5 g (0.11 to 0.18 oz). This medium-sized hermit has mostly olive green upperparts with reddish uppertail coverts. The next-to-inner tail feathers are longer than the others and all have white tips. Their underparts are cinnamon red. The face has a black "mask" with a white supercilium and gular stripe. The sexes are similar but the female has shorter wings and a less strongly decurved bill.

== Distribution and habitat ==
Major taxonomic systems place the planalto hermit in a wide swath of Brazil south of the Amazon rainforest, eastern Bolivia, northern Argentina and much of Paraguay. The South American Classification Committee (SACC) of the American Ornithological Society places the species in those four countries and also notes many records in Peru. It inhabits a variety of landscapes including non-forested but "vegetation-rich" areas, dry forest, secondary forest, and gallery forest. It is also found in human-modified environments as long as trees and herbs are present. In elevation it ranges from 400 to 2,100 m (1,300 to 6,900 ft).

== Behavior ==
=== Movement ===
The planalto hermit is thought to be partly migratory in some parts of its range but definitive data are not available.

=== Feeding ===
The planalto hermit is probably a "trap-line" feeder like other hermit hummingbirds, visiting a circuit of flowering plants for nectar. It also consumes small arthropods.

=== Breeding ===
The planalto hermit's nesting season is not fully defined but appears to span from August to April. Its nest is a long cone-shaped cup made of plant material and spider web. In contrast to most other Phaethornis hermits, it hangs the nest from a vertical branch, in a cavity of a rock face, and also in or under human structures like culverts, bridges, and abandoned buildings. The clutch size is two eggs.

=== Vocalization ===
The planalto hermit's song is variable, "often a sequence of evenly-spaced, alternating, single and double notes, e.g. 'ti-tsi...tsi...tsi...tsi...ti-tsi...tsi..tsi', but also sometimes triple-noted phrases such as 'chu-tsi-tsi...chu-tsi-tsi...chu-tsi-tsi...'."

== Status ==
The IUCN has assessed the planalto hermit as being of Least Concern. Though its population size and trend are unknown, it is common throughout its large range, occurs in several protected areas, and is well adapted to human-made environments such as gardens and city parks.
