= Limonin =

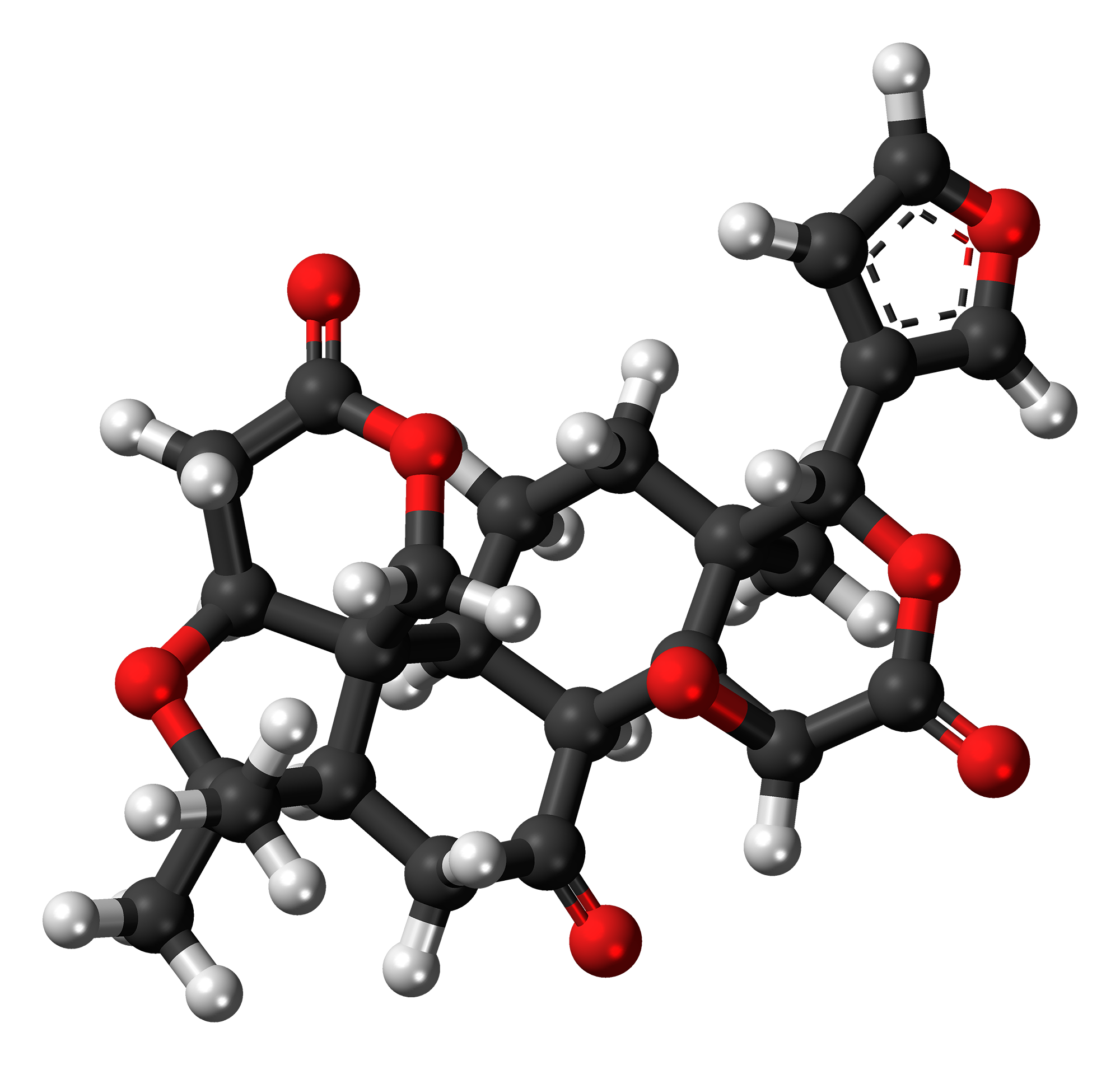

Names
- Preferred IUPAC name (2aR,4aR,4bR,5aS,8S,8aS,10aR,10bR,14aS)-8-(Furan-3-yl)-2,2,4a,8a-tetramethyldecahydro-11H,13H-oxireno[2,3-c]pyrano[4′′,3′′:2′,3′]furo[3′,4′:5,6]naphtho[1,2-d]pyran-4,6,13(2H,5aH)-trione
- Other names: Limonoate D-ring-lactone; Limonoic acid di-δ-lactone; 7,16-Dioxo-7,16-dideoxylimondiol

Identifiers
| CAS Number | 1180-71-8 |
| 3D model (JSmol) | Interactive image |
| ChEBI | CHEBI:16226 |
| ChEMBL | ChEMBL517449 |
| ChemSpider | 156367 |
| ECHA InfoCard | 100.236.039 |
| PubChem CID | 179651 |
| UNII | L0F260866S |
| CompTox Dashboard (EPA) | DTXSID8045985 |
- InChI: InChI=1S/C26H30O8/c1-22(2)15-9-16(27)24(4)14(25(15)12-31-18(28)10-17(25)33-22)5-7-23(3)19(13-6-8-30-11-13)32-21(29)20-26(23,24)34-20/h6,8,11,14-15,17,19-20H,5,7,9-10,12H2,1-4H3/t14-,15-,17-,19-,20+,23-,24-,25+,26+/m0/s1 Key: KBDSLGBFQAGHBE-MSGMIQHVSA-N; InChI=1/C26H30O8/c1-22(2)15-9-16(27)24(4)14(25(15)12-31-18(28)10-17(25)33-22)5-7-23(3)19(13-6-8-30-11-13)32-21(29)20-26(23,24)34-20/h6,8,11,14-15,17,19-20H,5,7,9-10,12H2,1-4H3/t14-,15-,17-,19-,20+,23-,24-,25+,26+/m0/s1 Key: KBDSLGBFQAGHBE-MSGMIQHVBF
- SMILES: O=C4[C@@]6(C)[C@@]72O[C@@H]7C(=O)O[C@@H](c1ccoc1)[C@]2(C)CC[C@@H]6[C@]35COC(=O)C[C@@H]5OC([C@@H]3C4)(C)C

Properties
| Chemical formula | C_{26}H_{30}O_{8} |
| Molar mass | 470.52 g/mol |
- Except where otherwise noted, data are given for materials in their standard state (at 25 °C [77 °F], 100 kPa). verify (what is ?) Infobox references

Limonin is a limonoid, and a bitter, white, crystalline substance found in citrus and other plants. It is also known as limonoate D-ring-lactone and limonoic acid di-delta-lactone. Chemically, it is a member of the class of compounds known as furanolactones.

== Sources ==
Limonin is enriched in citrus fruits and is often found at higher concentrations in seeds, for example orange and lemon seeds.

== Presence in citrus products ==
Limonin and other limonoid compounds contribute to the bitter taste of some citrus food products. Researchers have proposed removal of limonoids from orange juice and other products (known as "debittering") through the use of polymeric films.

== Research ==
Limonin is under basic research to assess its possible biological properties.
