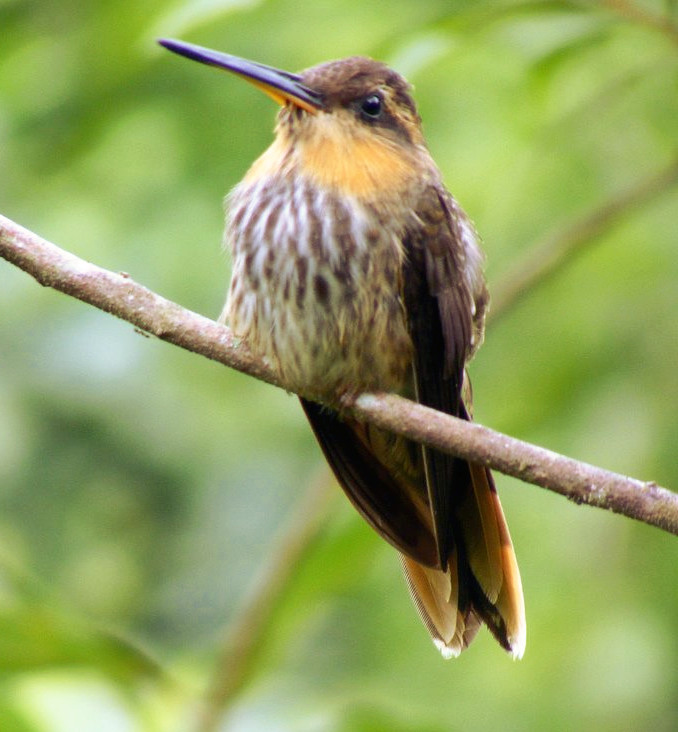
- The saw-billed hermit (Ramphodon naevius) is among the most primitive living hummingbird species.

Scientific classification
- Kingdom: Animalia
- Phylum: Chordata
- Class: Aves
- Order: Apodiformes
- Family: Trochilidae
- Subfamily: Phaethornithinae; Jardine, 1833

Genera
- See text

= Hermit (hummingbird) =

Subfamily of birds

The hermits are tropical and subtropical hummingbirds in the subfamily Phaethornithinae, comprising 37 species in six genera. They occur from southern Mexico, through Central America, to South America as far south as northern Argentina.

Their plumage typically involves greens, browns, rufous or grey. Most species show some green or bronze iridescence to the upperparts, but this is far less conspicuous than that of many other hummingbirds. The male and female plumages of hermits are very similar, with differences limited to details of bill-shape, tail-shape and/or strength of colours/patterns. Most species of hermit do not show the strong sexual dimorphism usually associated with hummingbirds; green hermit is an exception to this rule.

Hermits in the type genus, Phaethornis, have a long decurved bill (except for three species, P. koepkeae, P. philippii and P. bourcieri, with virtually straight bills) with a red or yellow base to the lower mandible, and their two central tail feathers are elongated and tipped with white, buff or ochre. The crown of the head is flat, and two pale facial stripes enclose a dusky mask.

Most hermits are restricted to the edge and undergrowth of forest, woodland and second growth, but some species (e.g. the planalto hermit) also occurs in more open habitats.

Many species of hermits form leks and congregate on traditional display grounds, where females visit to choose a mate. Male hermits are generally less aggressive than other male hummingbirds, although both sexes will defend a feeding territory.

Most hermits are associated with heliconias, but will utilize other nectar sources (flowers of Centropogon, Passiflora, Costus, etc.). To a lesser degree, they will capture small arthropods. The long, decurved bills typical of this group of hummingbirds are an adaptation to certain flowers. This is taken to an extreme in the two sicklebills (Eutoxeres spp.) with their very decurved bills. Many species, including the rufous-breasted hermit, also use the heliconias for nesting, attaching their conical nest to the underside of one of the plant's broad leaves.

- Phaethornithinae
  - - Eutoxeres
    - - Ramphodon
      - - Phaethornis
        - - Glaucis
          - Threnetes

Phylogeny based on a molecular phylogenetic study published in 2014. The genus Anopetia was not sampled.

The taxonomy of some groups has changed significantly in recent years. Apart from those issues discussed at Phaethornis, a taxonomic problem occurs with the Threnetes leucurus/T. niger complex. Schuchmann & Hinkelmann (1999) considered the sooty barbthroat a melanistic variant of the T. leucurus, but as it was described first, its scientific name was adopted for the entire species; pale-tailed barbthroat (T. niger). This, however, has not been accepted by all authorities, notably SACC, which consider both T. niger and T. leucurus as valid species. Additionally, Mallet-Rodrigues (2006) suggested the taxon loehkeni should be considered a valid species, the bronze-tailed barbthroat.

Three additional species, the tooth-billed hummingbird (Androdon aequatorialis), the green-fronted lancebill (Doryfera ludovicae) and the blue-fronted lancebill (D. johannae), have been included in this subfamily in the past, but are now placed in Polytminae.

== Species in taxonomic order ==
Image	Genus	Living species
	Ramphodon Lesson, 1830	Saw-billed hermit, Ramphodon naevius
	Eutoxeres Bourcier, 1847	White-tipped sicklebill, Eutoxeres aquila; Buff-tailed sicklebill, Eutoxeres condamini
	Glaucis Boie, 1831	Hook-billed hermit, Glaucis dohrnii; Rufous-breasted hermit or hairy hermit, Glaucis hirsutus; Bronzy hermit, Glaucis aeneus
	Threnetes Gould, 1852	Band-tailed barbthroat, Threnetes ruckeri; Sooty barbthroat, Threnetes niger; Pale-tailed barbthroat, Threnetes leucurus
	Anopetia Simon, 1918	Broad-tipped hermit, Anopetia gounellei
	Phaethornis Swainson, 1827	Dusky-throated hermit, Phaethornis squalidus; Streak-throated hermit, Phaethornis rupurumii; Tapajós hermit, Phaethornis aethopygus; Little hermit, Phaethornis longuemareus; Minute hermit, Phaethornis idaliae; Cinnamon-throated hermit, Phaethornis nattereri; Black-throated hermit, Phaethornis atrimentalis; Stripe-throated hermit, Phaethornis striigularis; Gray-chinned hermit, Phaethornis griseogularis; Reddish hermit, Phaethornis ruber; White-browed hermit, Phaethornis stuarti; Buff-bellied hermit, Phaethornis subochraceus; Sooty-capped hermit, Phaethornis augusti; Planalto hermit, Phaethornis pretrei; Scale-throated hermit, Phaethornis eurynome; Pale-bellied hermit, Phaethornis anthophilus; White-bearded hermit, Phaethornis hispidus; White-whiskered hermit, Phaethornis yaruqui; Green hermit, Phaethornis guy; Tawny-bellied hermit, Phaethornis syrmatophorus; Koepcke's hermit, Phaethornis koepckeae; Needle-billed hermit, Phaethornis philippii; Straight-billed hermit, Phaethornis bourcieri; Long-billed hermit, Phaethornis longirostris; Mexican hermit, Phaethornis mexicanus; Long-tailed hermit, Phaethornis superciliosus; Great-billed hermit, Phaethornis malaris
