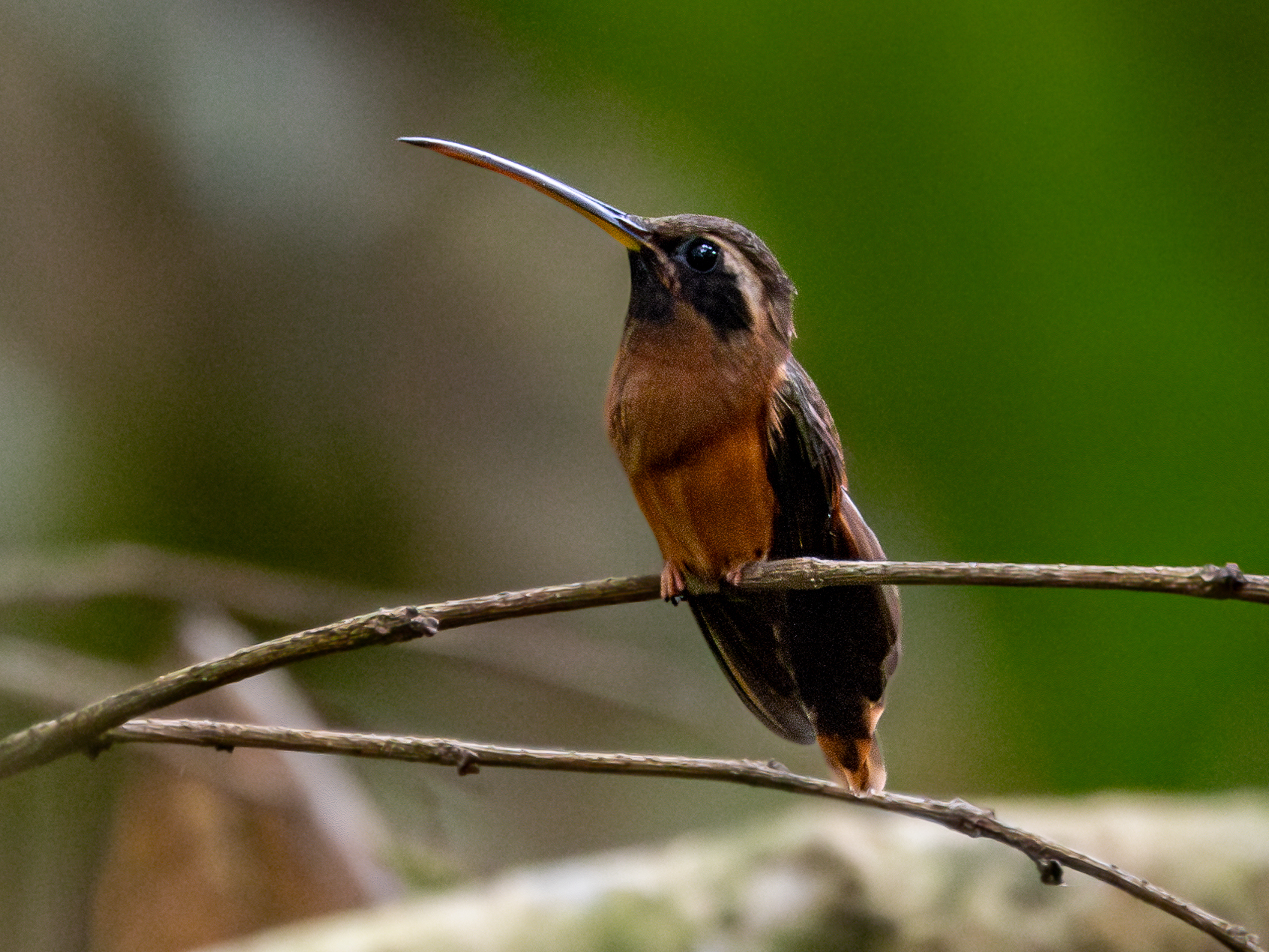

Conservation status
- Vulnerable (IUCN 3.1)
- CITES Appendix II

Scientific classification
- Kingdom: Animalia
- Phylum: Chordata
- Class: Aves
- Order: Apodiformes
- Family: Trochilidae
- Genus: Phaethornis
- Species: P. aethopygus

Binomial name
- Phaethornis aethopygus Zimmer, 1950

= Tapajós hermit =

Species of hummingbird

The Tapajós hermit (Phaethornis aethopygus) is a species of hummingbird in the family Trochilidae. It is endemic to Brazil.

== Taxonomy and systematics ==
The Tapajós hermit was first described in 1950 as a subspecies of the little hermit (P. longuemareus). At that time many small hermits now treated as separate species were considered subspecies of the little hermit, and the Tapajós hermit was believed to be most closely related to the black-throated hermit (P. atrimentalis). In 1996 it was suggested that the Tapajós hermit was entirely invalid, and actually represented a hybrid between the reddish (P. ruber) and streak-throated (P. rupurumii) hermits. In 2009 this hypothesis was shown to be incorrect, and the Tapajós hermit was recognized as a valid species.

The Tapajós hermit is monotypic.

== Description ==
The Tapajós hermit is about 9 cm (3.5 in) long. The male has a metallic olive green crown and back with reddish edges to the feathers and a rich reddish rump. The tail is rounded; the feathers are dusky brownish with reddish shafts and all but the outermost have white at their base. The face is blackish with a pale supercilium and a reddish malar stripe. The chin is white and the throat black becoming rufous on the neck, chest, and belly. The female is similar but with a paler rump and buffy olive underparts with a reddish tinge.

== Distribution and habitat ==
The Tapajós hermit is found in Brazil between the Tapajós and Xingu Rivers, north-flowing tributaries of the Amazon River. It inhabits primary forest but also tolerates logged and burned areas. It has been observed in a heavily disturbed terra firme area.

== Behavior ==
=== Feeding ===
The Tapajós hermit feeds on nectar and is assumed to also consume small insects and other invertebrates.

=== Breeding ===
Male Tapajós hermits display to females at leks, but nothing else is known about the species' breeding phenology.

=== Vocalization ===
The Tapajós hermit's song is "a long high-pitched phrase repeated incessantly without pauses between phrases...e.g. 'tsi ... tsi ... tsi ... tsi .. tsi-tsi-tse-tsee-chup-chup'."

== Status ==
The IUCN has assessed the Tapajós hermit as Vulnerable. Its population size is not known but is thought to be declining due to deforestation and the paving of a major highway with accompanying development.
