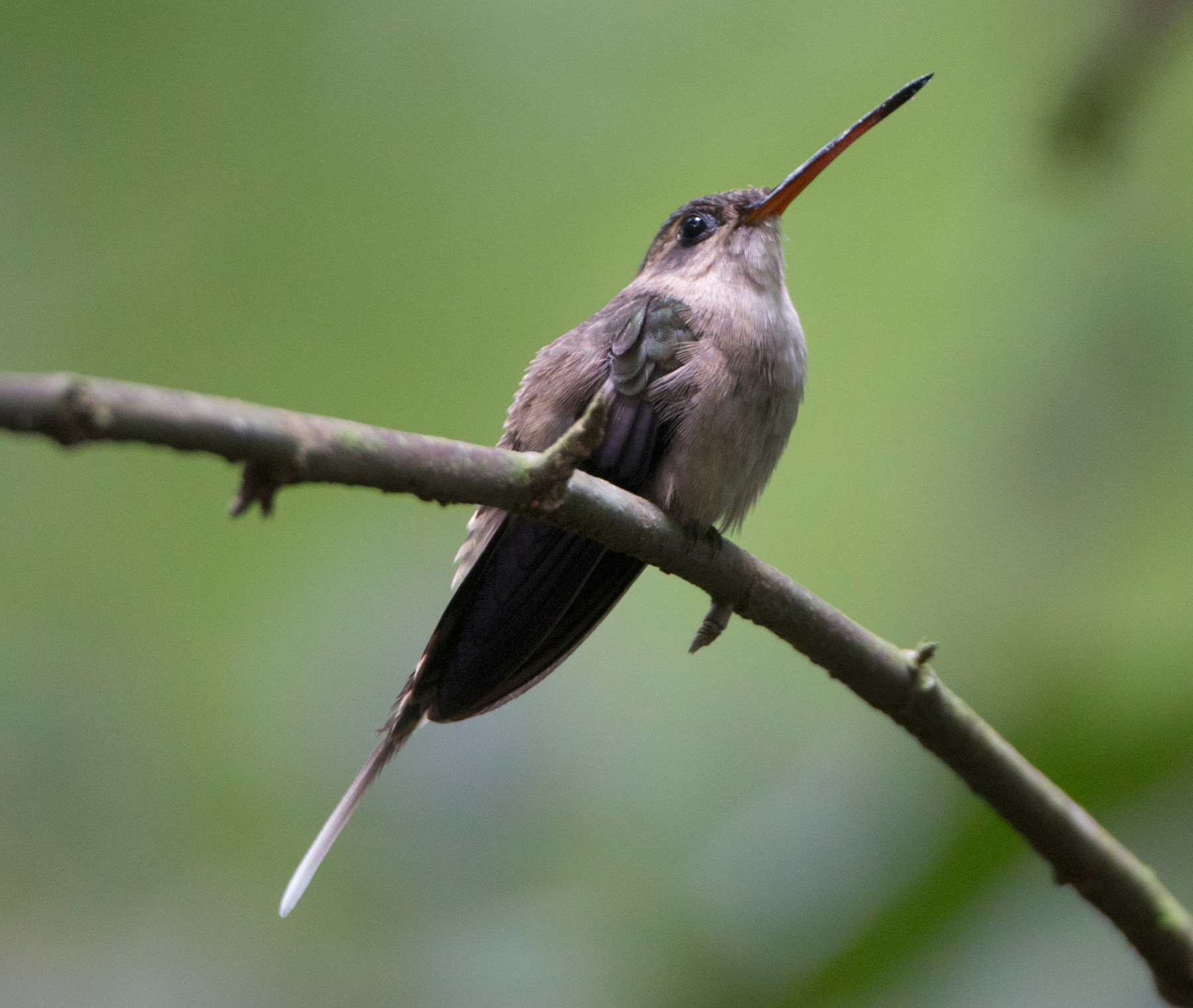

Conservation status
- Least Concern (IUCN 3.1)
- CITES Appendix II

Scientific classification
- Kingdom: Animalia
- Phylum: Chordata
- Class: Aves
- Order: Apodiformes
- Family: Trochilidae
- Genus: Phaethornis
- Species: P. bourcieri

Binomial name
- Phaethornis bourcieri (Lesson, 1832)

= Straight-billed hermit =

Species of hummiingbird

The straight-billed hermit (Phaethornis bourcieri) is a species of bird in the family Trochilidae, the hummingbirds. It is found in Brazil, Colombia, Ecuador, French Guiana, Guyana, Peru, Suriname, and Venezuela.

== Taxonomy and systematics ==
The straight-billed hermit and needle-billed hermit (P. philippii) were at one time placed in genus Ametrornis that was later merged into Phaethornis. The South American Classification Committee (SACC) of the American Ornithological Society, the International Ornithological Committee (IOC), and the Clements taxonomy recognize two subspecies, the nominate P. b. bourcieri and P. b. major. However, BirdLife International's Handbook of the Birds of the World (HBW) follows a 2017 publication and treats P. b. major as a separate species, the ash-bellied hermit. A third subspecies, P. b. whitelyi, has been proposed but its characteristics are within the variation seen in the rest of the nominate.

== Description ==
The straight-billed hermit is 12 to 14 cm (4.7 to 5.5 in) long and weighs 3.5 to 5 g (0.12 to 0.18 oz). It is one of the few hermit hummingbirds with a straight bill. Its upperparts are olive green and the underparts brownish to grayish. The innermost pair of tail feathers are longer than the others and have long white tips; the others also have white tips. P. b. major is significantly larger than the nominate but has similar plumage.

== Distribution and habitat ==
The nominate subspecies of straight-billed hermit is found from southeastern Colombia south through eastern Ecuador into northeastern Peru and east through southern Venezuela and the Guianas into Brazil as far south as both banks of the Amazon River. P. b. major is found only in east-central Brazil south of the Amazon River and east of the lower Tapajós River. The species mostly inhabits the understory of terra firme forest and adjacent semi-deciduous and foothill forests. It can occasionally be found in other landscapes such as várzea forest, bamboo thickets, plantations, and secondary forest. In elevation it ranges as high as 1,600 m (5,200 ft), in southern Venezuela.

== Behavior ==
=== Feeding ===
The straight-billed hermit is a "trap-line" feeder like other hermit hummingbirds, visiting a circuit of a variety of flowering plants for nectar. It also consumes small arthropods.

=== Breeding ===
The straight-billed hermit's breeding seasons vary throughout its large range, from March to May in Brazil and July to November in Peru. It builds a long cone-shaped nest from plant fibers and spider silk suspended under the tip of a long drooping leaf. The clutch size is two eggs.

=== Vocalization ===
The straight-billed hermit's song is "a high-pitched phrase repeated over and over, punctuated by short dull-sounding notes, 'tsii'ti'ti'tsii...tip...tip...tsii'ti'ti'tsii....tip...tip...tip...'", and is very different from the songs of other Phaethornis hermits. Its calls are usually given in flight and include "a rather monotonous 'tseet' and a dull 'chep'."

== Status ==
The IUCN follows HBW taxonomy and has separately assessed the straight-billed hermit and "ash-bellied hermit" as being of Least Concern. The population size of neither is known but both are believed to be stable. When treated as a single species, it is common throughout its range and occurs in several protected areas.
