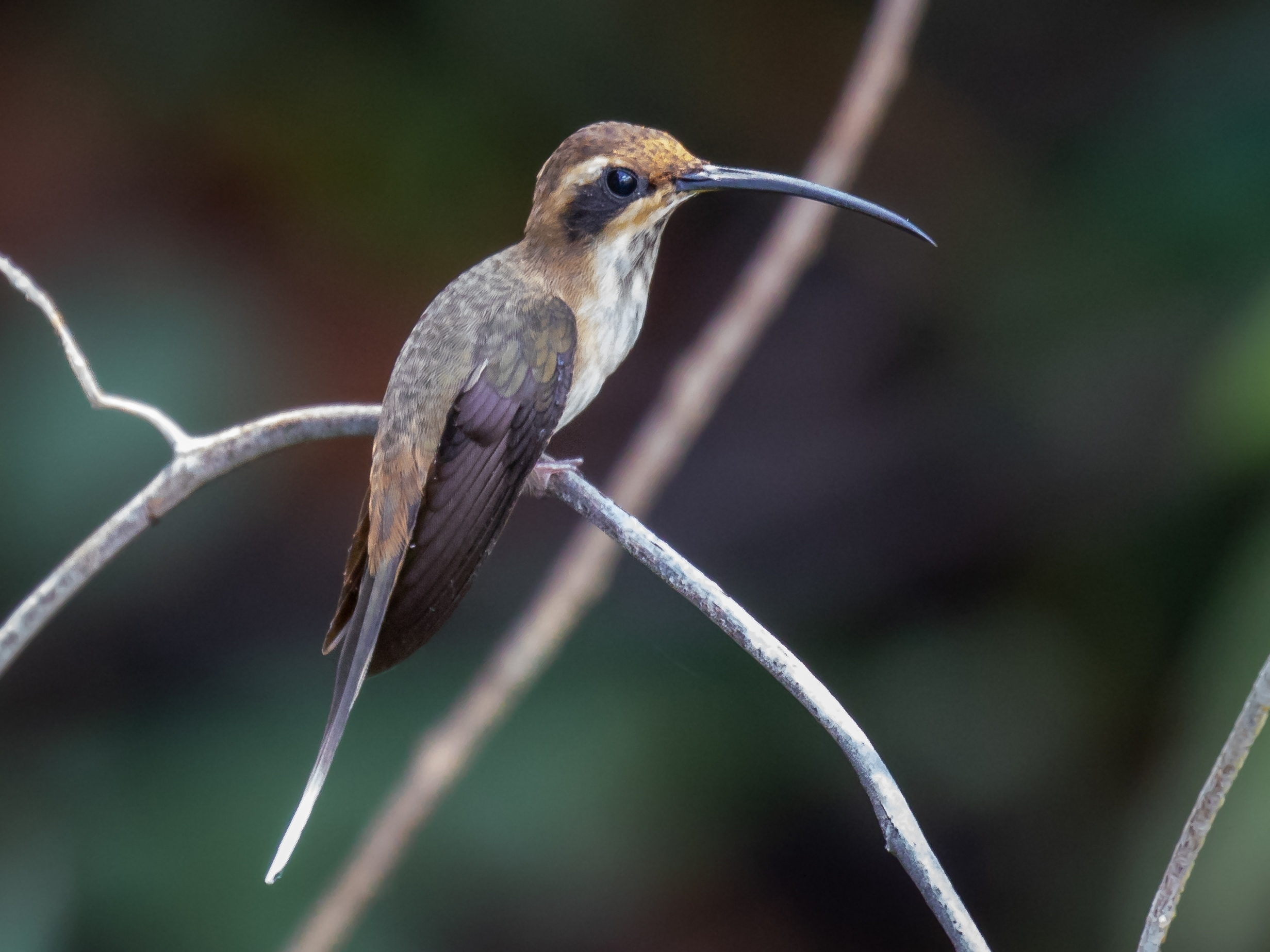
- Streak-throated hermit at Anavilhanas National Park in Amazonas, Brazil

Conservation status
- Least Concern (IUCN 3.1)
- CITES Appendix II (CITES)

Scientific classification
- Kingdom: Animalia
- Phylum: Chordata
- Class: Aves
- Clade: Strisores
- Order: Apodiformes
- Family: Trochilidae
- Genus: Phaethornis
- Species: P. rupurumii

Binomial name
- Phaethornis rupurumii Boucard, 1892

= Streak-throated hermit =

Species of hummingbird

The streak-throated hermit (Phaethornis rupurumii), also known as the Rupurumi hermit, is a species of hummingbird in the family Trochilidae. It is found in Brazil, Colombia, Guyana, and Venezuela.

== Taxonomy and systematics ==
The streak-throated hermit was for a time considered a subspecies of the dusky-throated hermit (P. squalidus). It has two subspecies, the nominate P. r. rupurumii and P. r. amazonicus. They are geographically separated and the latter might be a full species.

== Description ==
The streak-throated hermit is 10 to 12.1 cm (3.9 to 4.8 in) long and weighs 2.5 to 3 g (0.088 to 0.11 oz). It is generally brownish with a greenish back and brownish gray underparts. It has a black "mask" and white supercilium and malar stripe and a very dark brown throat that appears streaky. The sexes are generally alike.

== Distribution and habitat ==
The nominate subspecies of streak-throated hermit is found from the extreme eastern part of Colombia's Vichada Department through central and eastern Venezuela and western Guyana into northern Brazil's Roraima state. P. r. amazonicus is found in north-central Brazil along the Amazon River east of the Negro River. The species inhabits the understory at the edges of rainforest and the interior of várzea forest. It also inhabits drier and more open landscapes such as semi-deciduous and gallery forest, scrublands, river islands, and secondary forest. It is primarily a bird of the lowlands but reaches as high as 500 m (1,600 ft) in Venezuela and Guyana.

== Behavior ==
=== Movement ===
The streak-throated hermit is believed to be sedentary.

=== Feeding ===
The streak-throated hermit feeds on nectar and also on small arthropods, but details of its diet and foraging technique have not been published.

=== Breeding ===
The streak-throated hermit's breeding phenology has not been documented.

=== Vocalization ===
The streak-throated hermit's song is "an incessant 'tsi tsi jéb dé tsi tsi jéb dé' or 'eesee-eesee-eesee, eesee-eesee-eesee-swur'", typically sung from a perch near the ground.

== Status ==
The IUCN has assessed the streak-throated hermit as being of Least Concern, though its population size and trend are not known. It is very poorly known but appears to be locally common.
