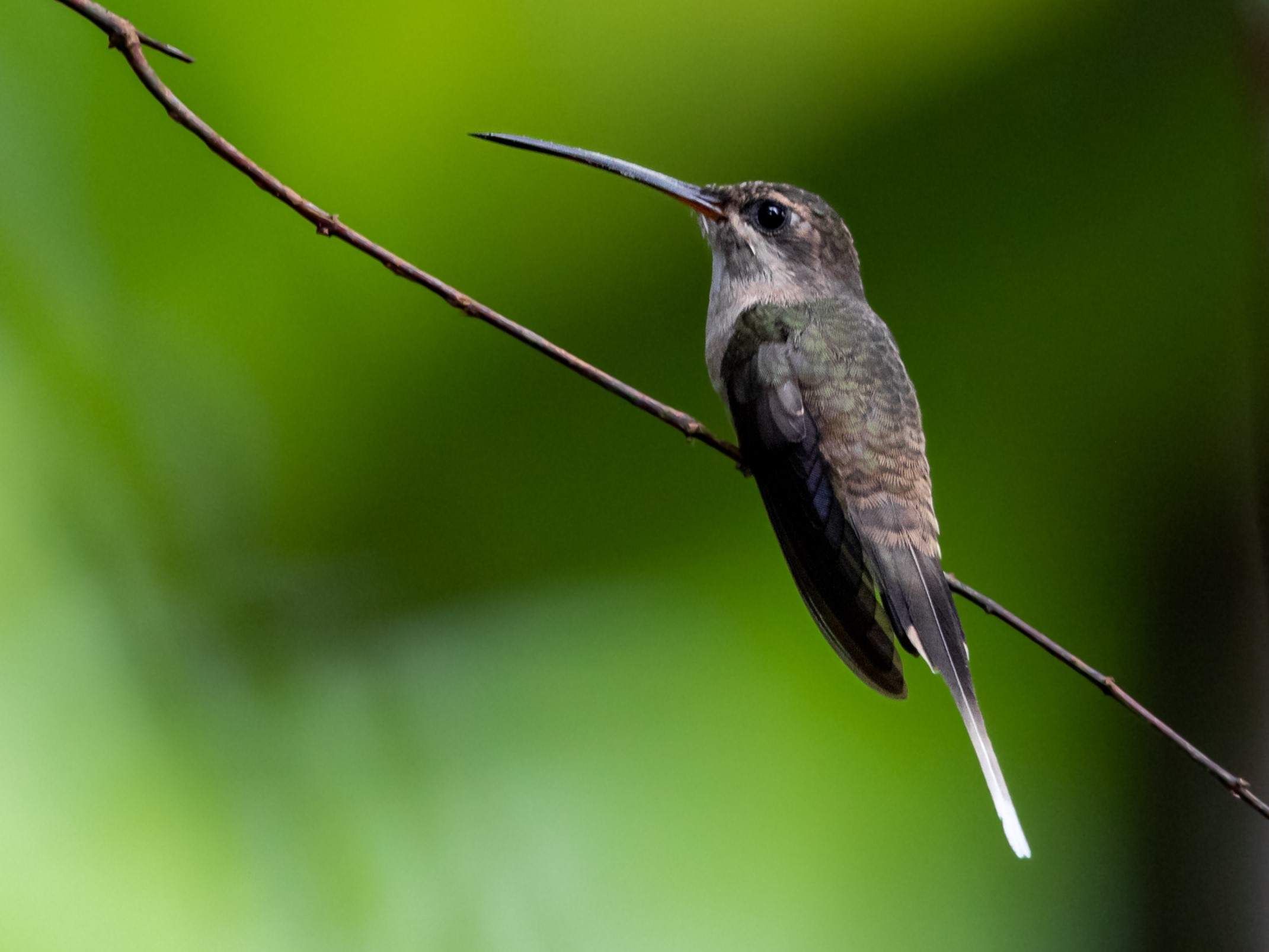

Conservation status
- Least Concern (IUCN 3.1)
- CITES Appendix II (CITES)

Scientific classification
- Kingdom: Animalia
- Phylum: Chordata
- Class: Aves
- Clade: Strisores
- Order: Apodiformes
- Family: Trochilidae
- Genus: Phaethornis
- Species: P. superciliosus

Binomial name
- Phaethornis superciliosus (Linnaeus, 1766)

Synonyms
- Trochilus superciliosus Linnaeus, 1766

= Long-tailed hermit =

Species of bird

The long-tailed hermit (Phaethornis superciliosus) is a large hummingbird that is a resident breeder in Venezuela, the Guianas, and north-eastern Brazil. This species was formerly referred to as the eastern long-tailed hermit.

== Taxonomy ==
The long-tailed hermit was formally described by the Swedish naturalist Carl Linnaeus in 1766 in the twelfth edition of his Systema Naturae under the binomial name Trochilus superciliosus. Linnaeus based his description on the "colibry à longue queue de Cayenne" that had been described and illustrated in 1760 by the French zoologist Mathurin Jacques Brisson. The specific epithet is from Latin superciliosa meaning "eye-browed". The long-tailed hermit is now the type species of the genus Phaethornis that was introduced in 1827 by William Swainson.

Two subspecies are recognised:

- P. s. superciliosus (Linnaeus, 1766) – south Venezuela, the Guianas and north Brazil (north of the Amazon)
- P. s. muelleri Hellmayr, 1911 – north Brazil (south of the Amazon)

The taxonomic history of this group is complicated, with similar hermit populations from both sides of the Andes being originally classed as a single long-tailed hermit species. The western population was then split as the western long-tailed hermit, P. longirostris, leading to the renaming of P. superciliosus as eastern long-tailed hermit. The further renaming of P. longirostris as long-billed hermit means that P. superciliosus no longer needs "eastern" in its English name.

A further problem relates to the taxonomy of the long-tailed hermit versus the great-billed hermit (P. malaris). Most taxa previously consider subspecies of the former (insolitus, moorei, ochraceiventris, bolivianus and margarettae) are now considered subspecies of the latter. A satisfactory taxonomic treatment of the entire P. longirostris/P. superciliosus/P. malaris group is still lacking according to some Neotropical ornithologists.

== Description ==
The adult long-tailed hermit is mainly dull brownish green above with a buff-tinged rump. It has a dark mask through the eye, bordered above and below with whitish-buff stripes. The underparts are pale greyish-buff in colour. The sexes are similar, although the female is slightly smaller. It is the largest of hermit hummingbirds, with a length of around 15 cm (5.9 in) and a body mass of 6.3 g (0.22 oz).

During the breeding season, male long-tailed hermits sing in communal leks of up to several dozen birds, and also wiggle their long tails in display. Competitive lek singing can occupy half of the daylight hours, the purpose of course being to attract females. The female selects the best lek singer to mate with. The song consists of sharp tsuk sounds.

The female long-tailed hermit is solely responsible for nest construction, incubation and feeding the young. She lays two white eggs in a conical nest of fibres and cobwebs suspended under a large Heliconia or banana leaf.

== Distribution and habitat ==
The long-tailed hermit inhabits forest undergrowth, usually near water and its preferred food plants. It is 13.5 cm long and weighs 4-6 g. The bill is very long and decurved (3.6-4.3 cm), with a red tipped black lower mandible, and the central feathers of the tapered tail are long (6.3-6.8 cm) and white-tipped.

== Behaviour ==
The food of this species is nectar, taken from large flowers, such as Heliconias, gingers and passion flowers, and small insects and spiders taken as an essential source of protein. Hatchlings are fed by the female with regurgitated invertebrates.

Long-tailed hermits are trap-line feeders; they do not defend territory, but visit seasonal flowers on routes through the forest up to 1 km long.
