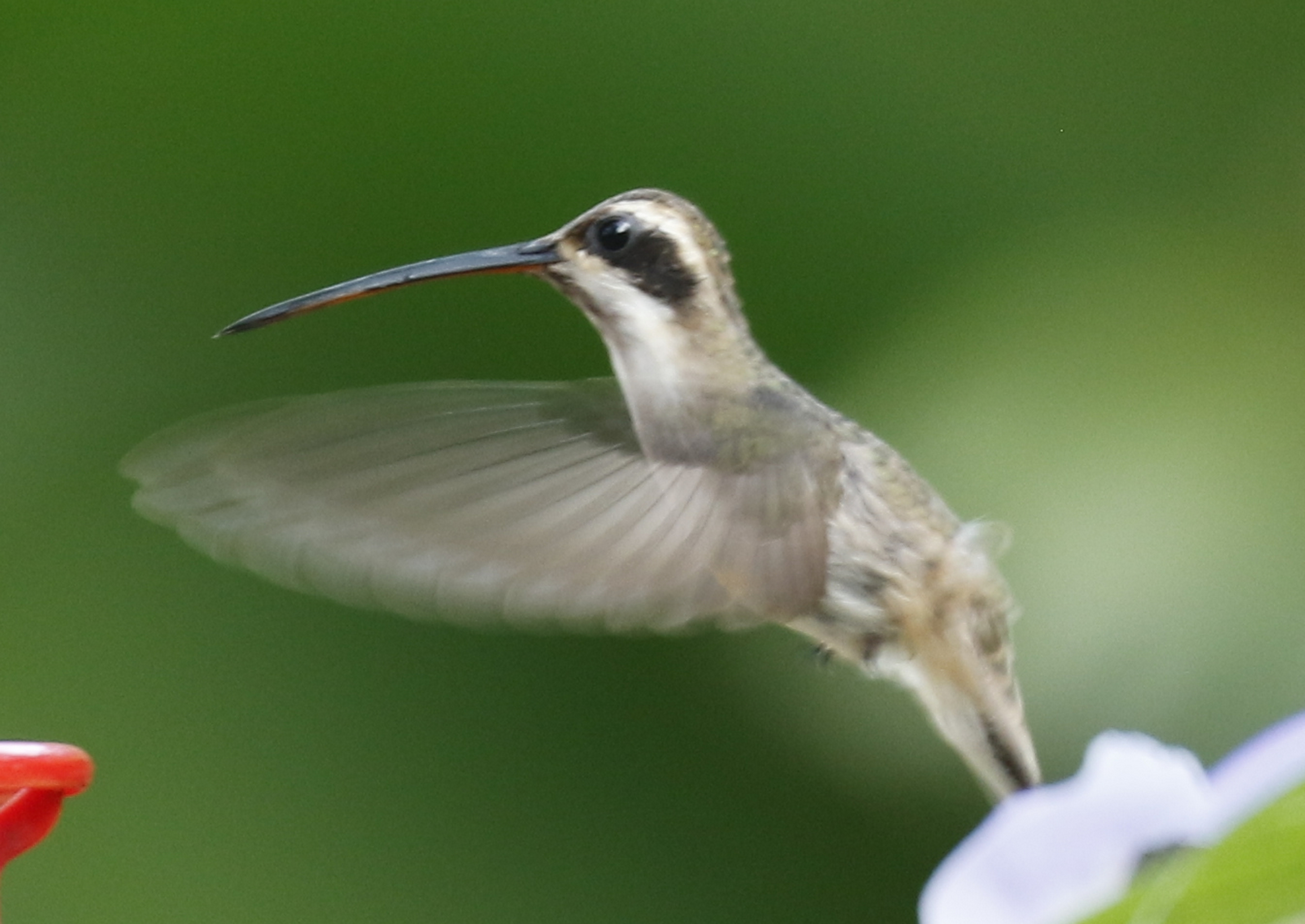
- Canopy Camp – Darien, Panama

Conservation status
- Least Concern (IUCN 3.1)
- CITES Appendix II (CITES)

Scientific classification
- Kingdom: Animalia
- Phylum: Chordata
- Class: Aves
- Clade: Strisores
- Order: Apodiformes
- Family: Trochilidae
- Genus: Phaethornis
- Species: P. anthophilus

Binomial name
- Phaethornis anthophilus (Bourcier, 1843)

= Pale-bellied hermit =

Species of hummingbird

The pale-bellied hermit (Phaethornis anthophilus) is a species of hummingbird in the family Trochilidae. It is found in Colombia, Panama, and Venezuela.

== Taxonomy and systematics ==
Though the scale-throated hermit is a member of the large genus Phaethornis it seems to have no close relatives, and at one time was placed in its own genus, Ametrornis. It has two subspecies, the nominate P. a. anthophilus and P. a. hyalinus. It has been suggested that a third subspecies, P. a. fuscicapillus, be split from anthophilus. A putative subspecies P. a. fuliginosus was based on a melanistic morph that as of 2021 had not been identified to species.

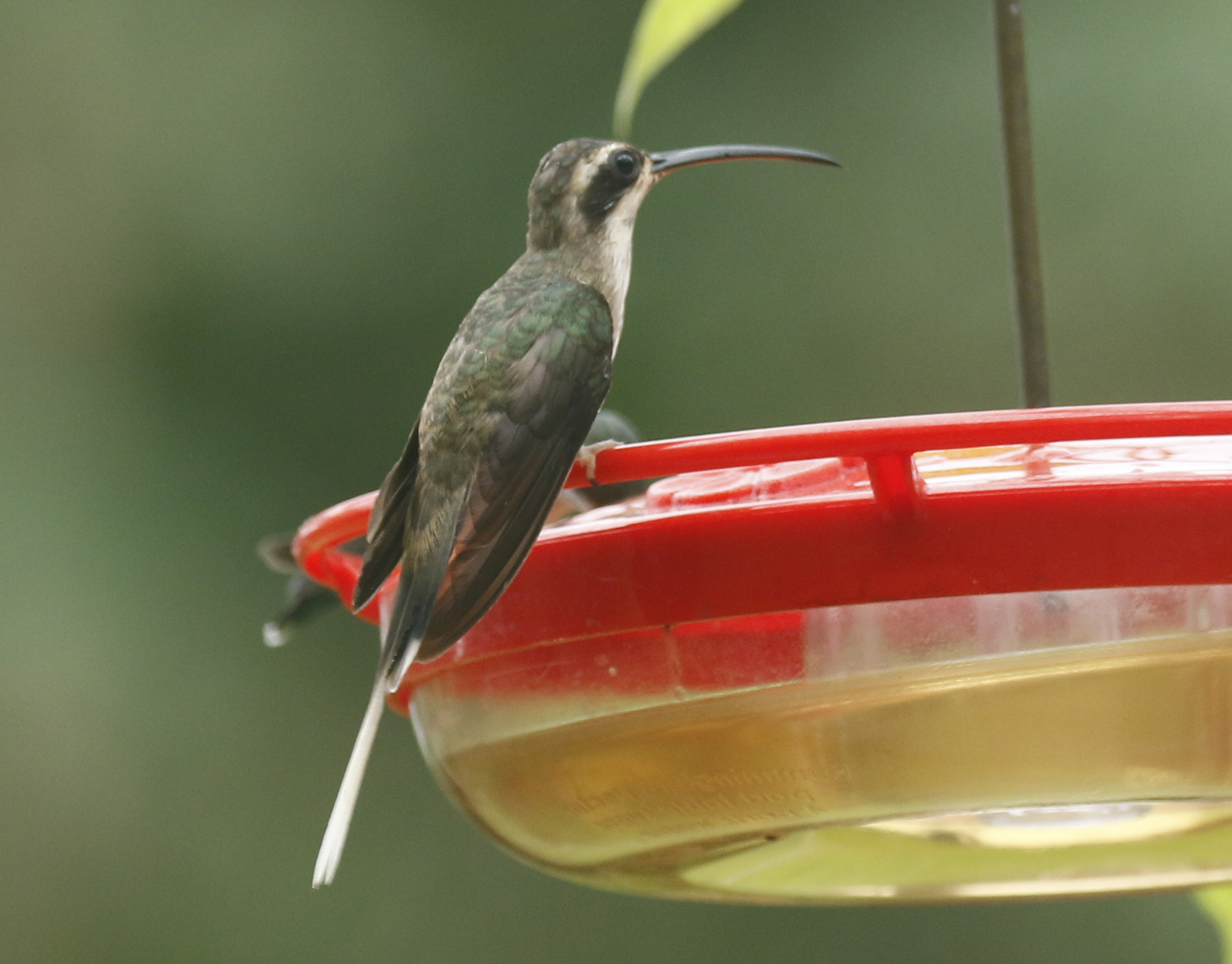
Canopy Camp - Darien, Panama

== Description ==
The pale-bellied hermit is about 13 cm (5.1 in) long. Males weigh 4.5 to 5.5 g (0.16 to 0.19 oz) and females 4 to 5 g (0.14 to 0.18 oz). This medium-sized hermit has dark green to olive green upperparts and light gray underparts. The face has a black "mask" with a buffy supercilium and a mostly white throat. The male's bill is almost straight and the female's is decurved. P. a. hyalinus has more bluish green upperparts and paler underparts than the nominate. Members of the suggested P. a. fuscicapillus have shorter wings and bills than the rest of the nominate.

== Distribution and habitat ==
The nominate subspecies of pale-bellied hermit taken as a whole is found in central Panama; northern, central, and eastern Colombia; and western and northern Venezuela. The suggested P. a. fuscicapillus is the population in Colombia's Eastern Andes and possibly includes the Venezuelan population as well. P. a. hyalinus is found only on the Pearl Islands off the Pacific coast of Panama.

The pale-bellied hermit mostly inhabits semi-deciduous forest and also drier woodland, secondary forest, gallery forest, plantations, and brushy and thorny landscapes. In elevation it ranges from sea level to about 1,500 m (4,900 ft).

== Behavior ==
=== Movement ===
Observations of pale-bellied hermits in northeastern Venezuela hint at regular movements but more data are needed.

=== Feeding ===
The pale-bellied hermit is a "trap-line" feeder like other hermit hummingbirds, visiting a circuit of a wide variety of flowering plants for nectar. It also consumes small arthropods.

=== Breeding ===
The pale-bellied hermit's breeding seasons appear to vary across its range but have not been fully defined. It suspends a cone-shaped nest under a drooping leaf like many other species of its genus. Its clutch size is two eggs.

=== Vocalization ===
The pale-bellied hermit's song has not been well described. Its calls are "rather piercing, high-pitched notes".

== Status ==
The IUCN has assessed the pale-bellied hermit as being of Least Concern, though its population size and trend are unknown. It is uncommon to locally common in most of its range, abundant in a few regions, and occurs in several protected areas.
