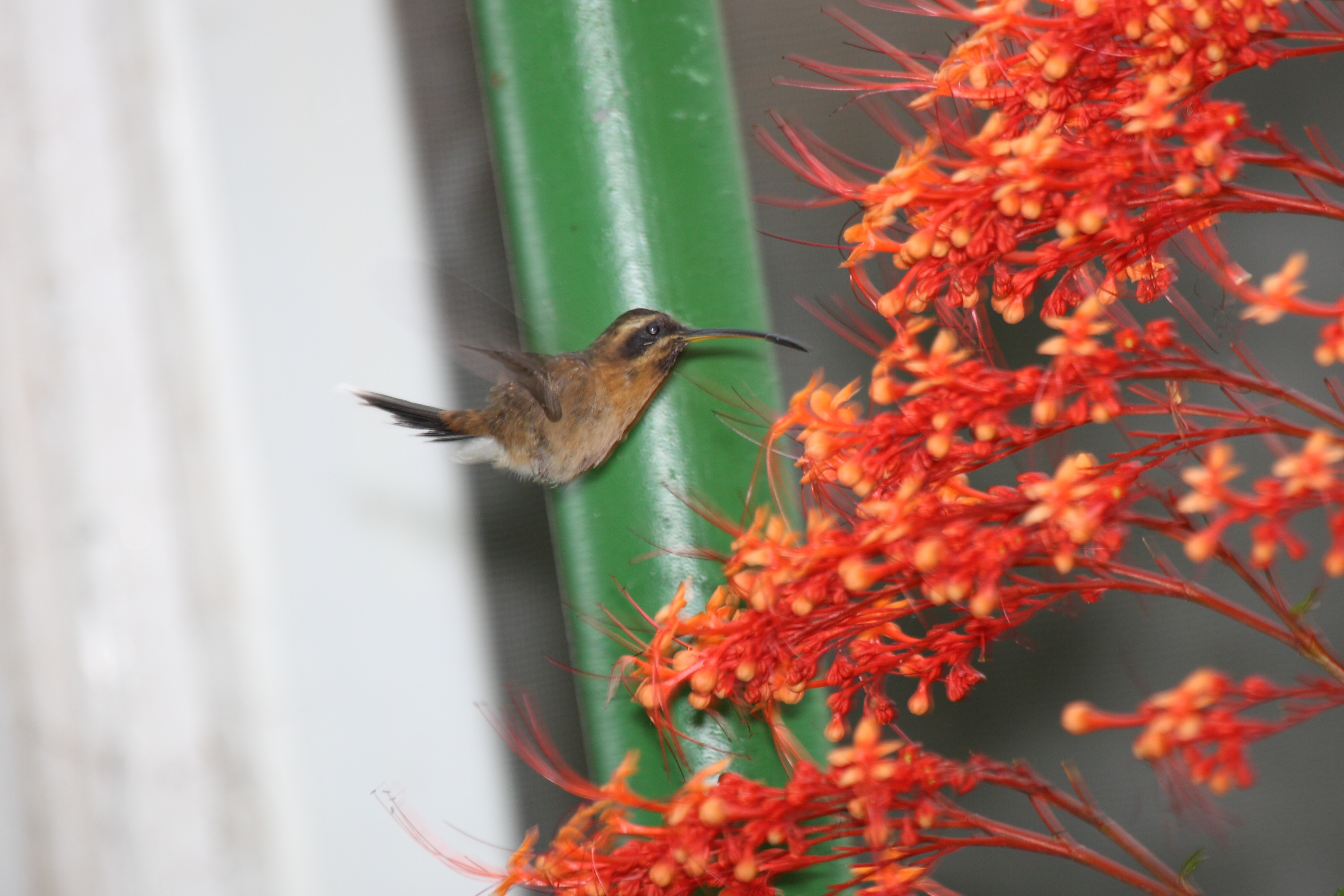

Conservation status
- Least Concern (IUCN 3.1)
- CITES Appendix II

Scientific classification
- Kingdom: Animalia
- Phylum: Chordata
- Class: Aves
- Clade: Strisores
- Order: Apodiformes
- Family: Trochilidae
- Genus: Phaethornis
- Species: P. longuemareus

Binomial name
- Phaethornis longuemareus (Lesson, 1832)

= Little hermit =

Species of bird

The little hermit (Phaethornis longuemareus) is a hummingbird that is a resident breeder in north-eastern Venezuela, northern Guyana, Suriname, French Guiana and Trinidad. This lowland species occurs in various semi-open wooded habitats, e.g. mangrove, secondary forest, plantations and scrub. In Trinidad it also occurs in rainforest. It is fairly common in most of its range, and therefore listed as Least Concern by BirdLife International on the IUCN Red List.

Previously, several other small hermits were considered subspecies of this species. This includes the stripe-throated hermit (P. striigularis) of Central America and north-western South America, the minute hermit (P. idaliae) of south-eastern Brazil, the Tapajós hermit (P. aethopyga) of south-eastern Amazonia, and the black-throated hermit (P. atrimentalis) of western Amazonia. As presently defined, the little hermit is monotypic.

It is among the smallest hummingbirds and birds overall with a total length of about 9 cm (3.5 in) and a weight of 2.5–3.5 g (0.09–0.12 oz). It is olive-green above with orange-ochraceous uppertail coverts and underparts (the belly often is greyer). As most other hermits, it has a long decurved bill, elongated central rectrices with whitish tips and a blackish mask bordered by a whitish-buff malar and supercilium. The upper mandible is black, the lower is yellow with a black tip. The male has a slightly darker throat than the female.

The males form communal leks where they sing and flash their tails to attract the females. The song varies over its range, but typically is high, squeaky, complex and repeated again and again.

The little hermit lays two eggs in a conical nest suspended under a large leaf. Incubation and fledging period not reported, but probably as relatives where incubations is 14–16 days, and fledging another 20–23 days.

The food of this species is nectar, taken from a wide variety of flowers (e.g. Heliconia), and some small insects and spiders. It feeds mainly by trap-lining.

== Gallery ==
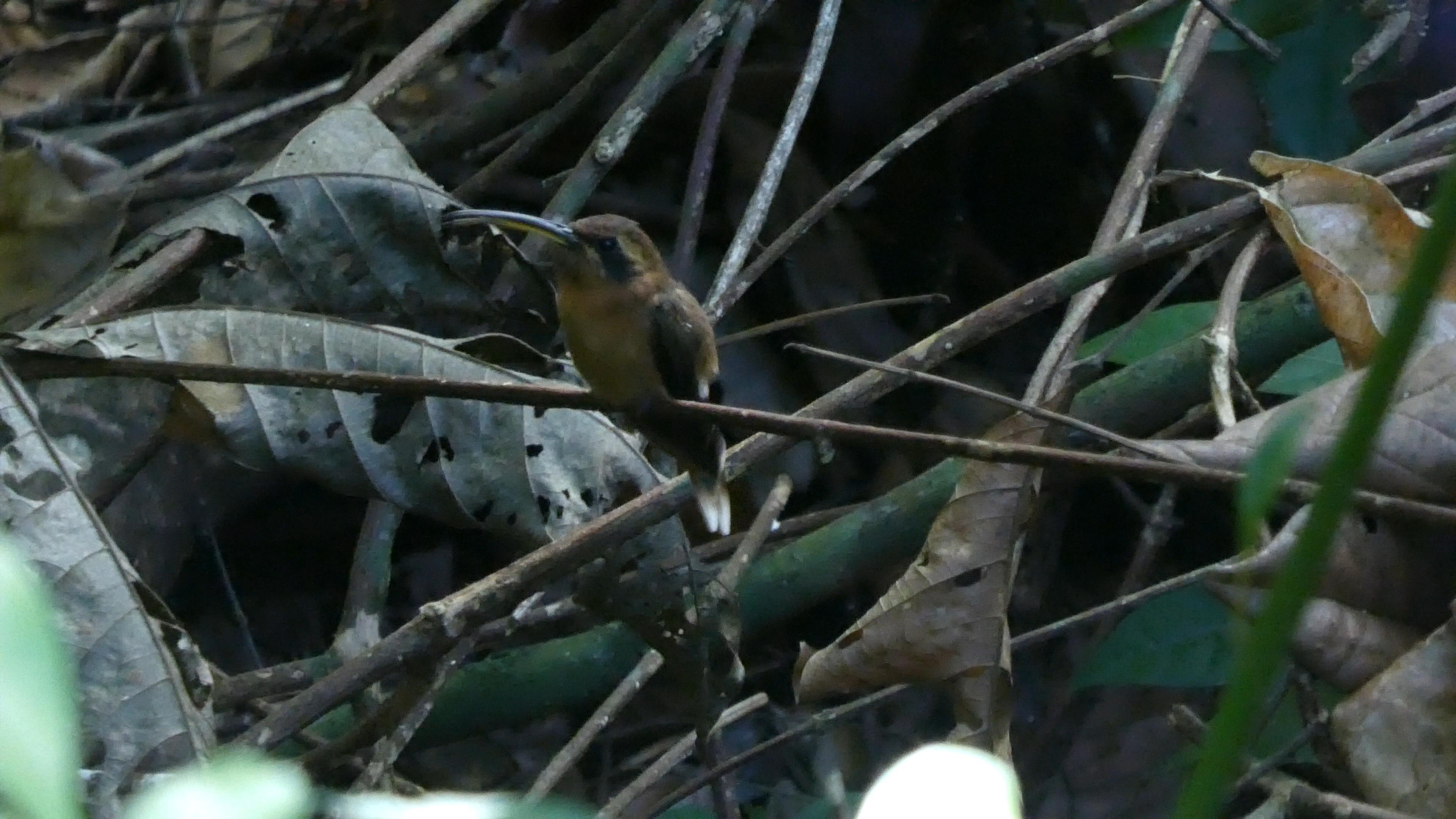
Male

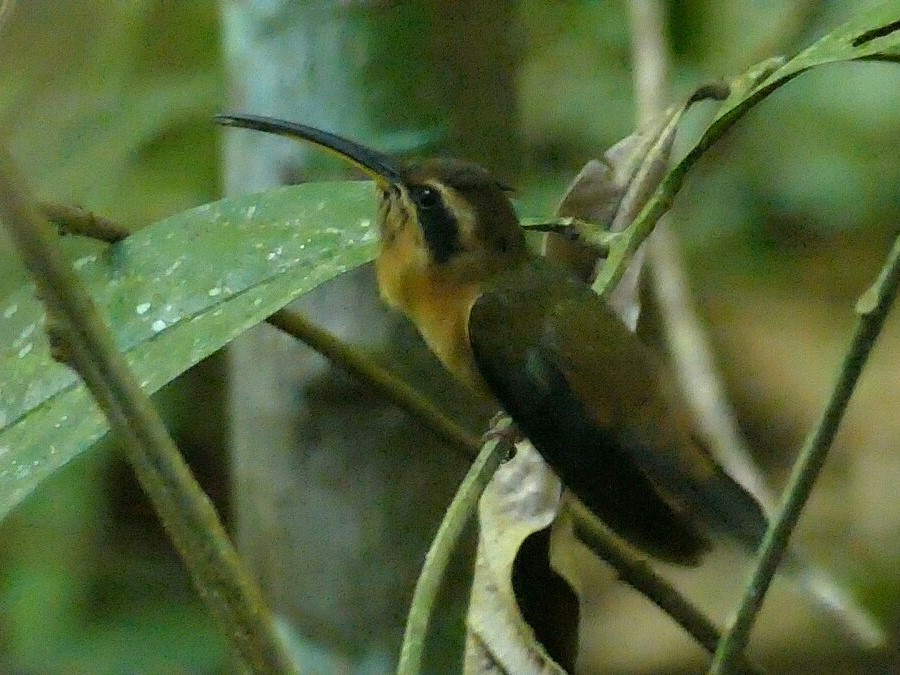
Male
