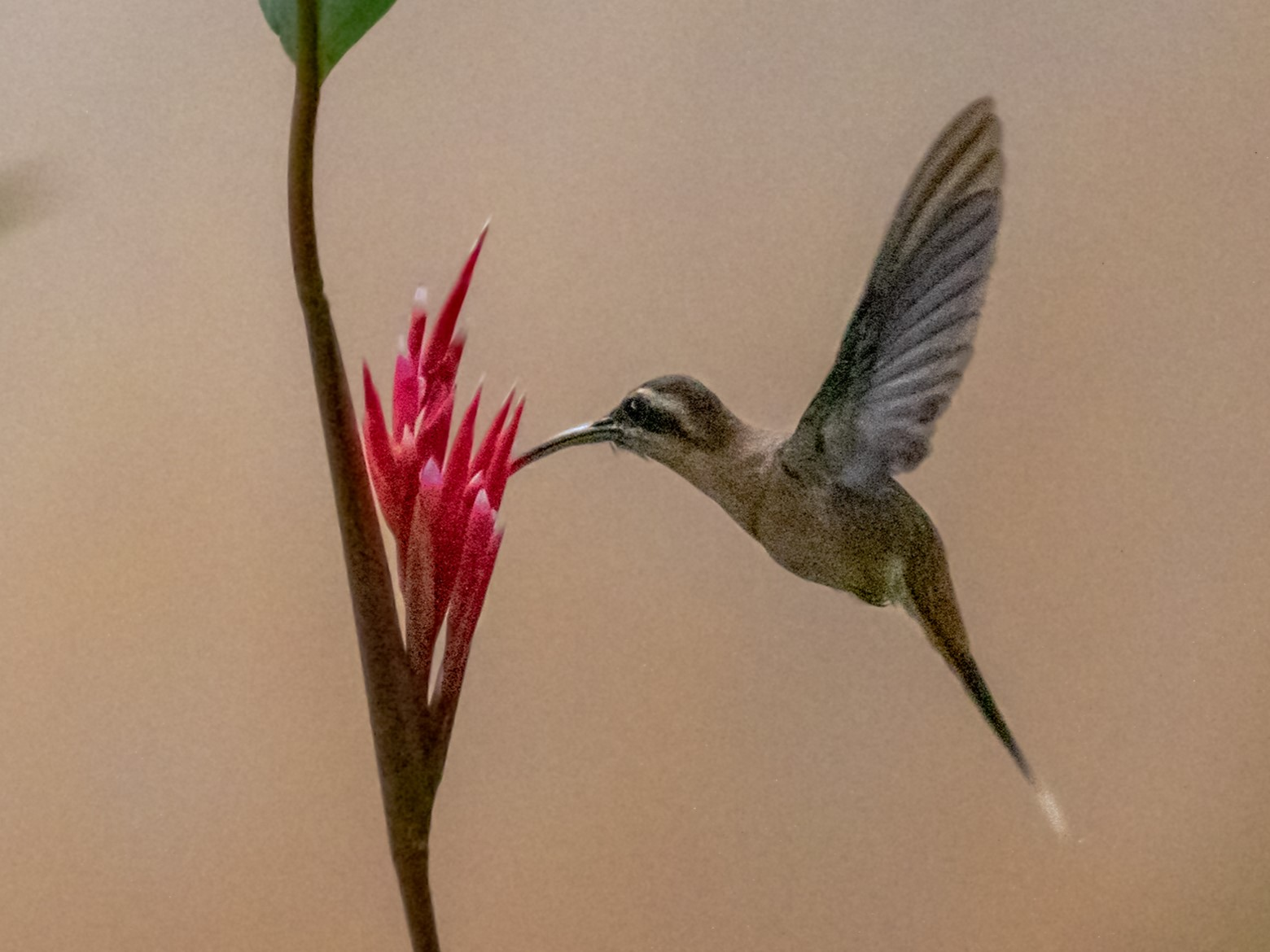

Conservation status
- Least Concern (IUCN 3.1)
- CITES Appendix II

Scientific classification
- Kingdom: Animalia
- Phylum: Chordata
- Class: Aves
- Clade: Strisores
- Order: Apodiformes
- Family: Trochilidae
- Genus: Phaethornis
- Species: P. nattereri

Binomial name
- Phaethornis nattereri Berlepsch, 1887

Synonyms
- See text

= Cinnamon-throated hermit =

Species of hummingbird

The cinnamon-throated hermit (Phaethornis nattereri) is a species in the hummingbird family Trochilidae. It is found in Bolivia and Brazil.

== Taxonomy and systematics ==
The taxonomy of the cinnamon-throated hermit is unsettled. Birds called Maranhao hermit are sometimes treated as a subspecies of the cinnamon-throated hermit, but at present major taxonomic systems follow the analyses by Hinkelmann that determined it is the male plumage of P. nattereri. However, the "Maranhao" hermit only occurs in the separate northern part of the range of P. nattereri, and as it appears to have different vocalizations from those of the other population it might warrant recognition as a distinct species, P. maranhaoensis. Molecular studies are needed to confirm or deny that assignment. As currently understood, the cinnamon-throated hermit is monotypic.

== Description ==
The cinnamon-throated hermit is about 10 cm (3.9 in) long and weighs 2.3 to 3 g (0.08 to 0.11 oz). Males have brownish upperparts, green wings, and tawny underparts. Their inner pair of tail feathers are long and white tipped. Both sexes have a black "mask" with a pale supercilium and malar stripe. Females are similar to the male but with a paler throat and longer central tail feathers.

== Distribution and habitat ==
The cinnamon-throated hermit is known from two separate areas. One includes eastern Bolivia and the adjacent Brazilian states of Mato Grosso and Rondônia. The other is in northeastern Brazil, mostly in the states of Maranhão, Piauí, and Ceará, and in Pará and Tocantins as well. It is speculated to also inhabit the broad region between the two known areas. The proposed "Maranhao" hermit is found in the northeastern area. The species inhabits several non-rainforest landscapes including semi-deciduous, secondary, and gallery forests, cerrado, and caatinga. In elevation it ranges from sea level to 500 m (1,600 ft).

== Behavior ==
=== Movement ===
The cinnamon-throated hermit is believed to be sedentary.

=== Feeding ===
The cinnamon-throated hermit is a "trap-line" feeder like other hermit hummingbirds, visiting a circuit of flowering plants for nectar. It also consumes small arthropods.

=== Breeding ===
Little is known about the cinnamon-throated hermit's breeding phenology. Its nest is reported to be suspended below a drooping leaf. The ""Maranhao" hermit breeds between November and April.

=== Vocalization ===
The cinnamon-throated hermit's song is "a high-pitched phrase repeated incessantly without pauses between phrases...e.g. 'tsee ... tsee ... tsee ... nya-ka-wee'."

== Status ==
The IUCN has assessed the cinnamon-throated hermit as being of Least Concern, though its population size has not been determined and is believed to be decreasing. It is poorly known though thought to be locally common, and occurs is a few protected areas.
