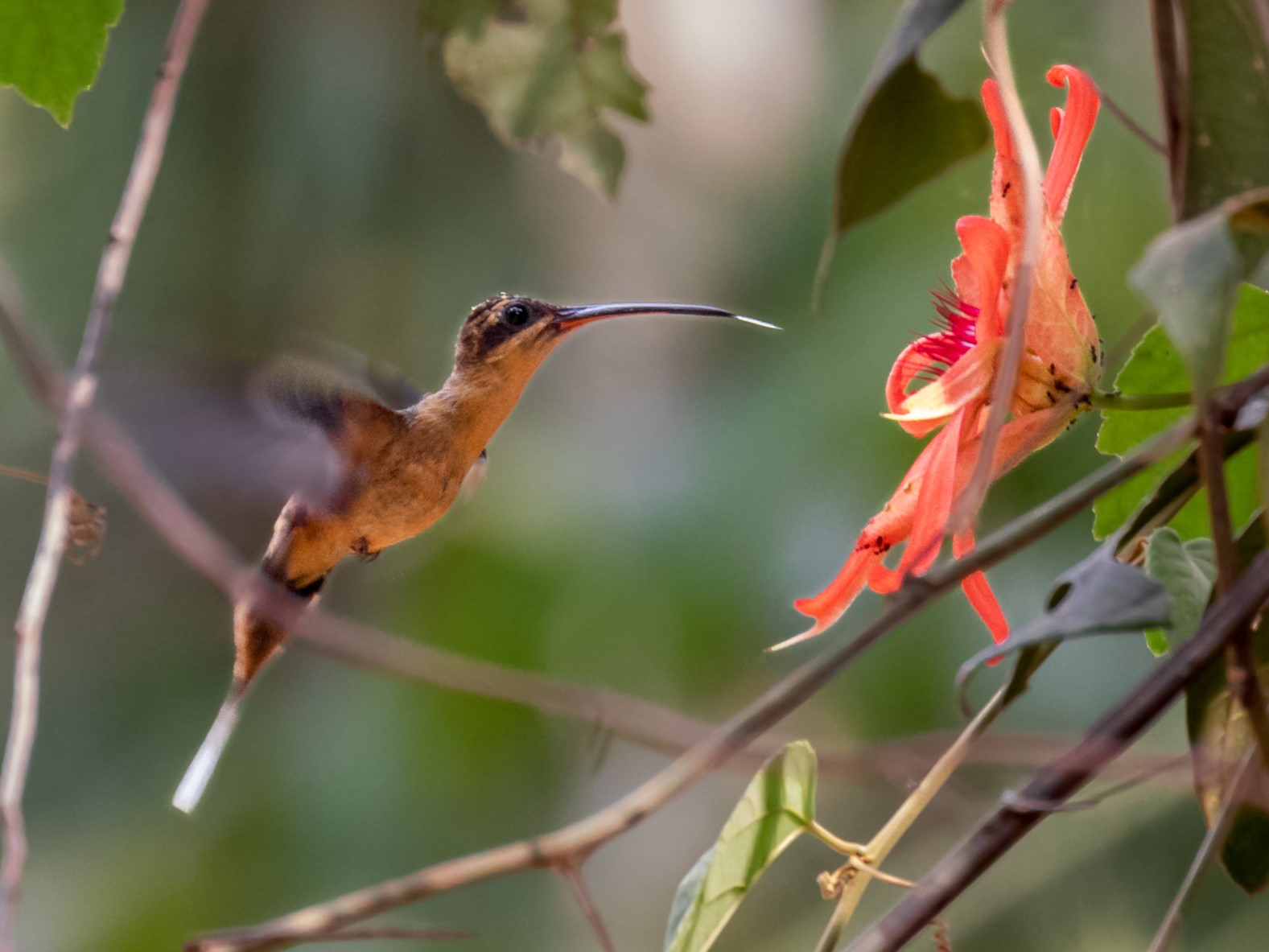

Conservation status
- Least Concern (IUCN 3.1)
- CITES Appendix II

Scientific classification
- Kingdom: Animalia
- Phylum: Chordata
- Class: Aves
- Order: Apodiformes
- Family: Trochilidae
- Genus: Phaethornis
- Species: P. philippii

Binomial name
- Phaethornis philippii (Bourcier, 1847)

= Needle-billed hermit =

Species of hummingbird

The needle-billed hermit (Phaethornis philippii) is a species of hummingbird in the family Trochilidae. It is found in Bolivia, Brazil, and Peru.

== Taxonomy and systematics ==
The needle-billed hermit is monotypic. It and the straight-billed hermit (P. bourcieri) were at one time placed in genus Ametrornis that was later merged into Phaethornis. The needle-billed hermit and Koepcke's hermit are sister species and may form a superspecies.

== Description ==
The needle-billed hermit is 12 to 13 cm (4.7 to 5.1 in) long. Males weigh 4 to 6 g (0.14 to 0.21 oz) and females 4 to 5.5 g (0.14 to 0.19 oz). It is one of the few hermit hummingbirds with a nearly straight bill. Its upperparts are dark bronzy green with a dull rufous rump. The tail is mostly dark green. The innermost pair of tail feathers are longer than the others and have long white tips; the others have broad buffy rufous tips. The face has a black "mask" bordered with narrow pale streaks. The underparts are orange.

== Distribution and habitat ==
The needle-billed hermit is found in eastern Peru, northern Bolivia, and western Brazil south of the Amazon River as far east as the Tapajós River. It inhabits the understory of lowland rainforest. It is mostly found in terra firme forest but also occurs in várzea forest, bamboo thickets, and plantations. In elevation it ranges only as high as 325 m (1,100 ft).

== Behavior ==
=== Feeding ===
The needle-billed hermit is a "trap-line" feeder like other hermit hummingbirds, visiting a circuit of a wide variety of flowering plants for nectar. It also consumes small arthropods.

=== Breeding ===
The needle-billed hermit's breeding season or seasons have not been determined but appear to span at least from June to September. One nest was suspended from the underside of a leaf tip.

=== Vocalization ===
The needle-billed hermit's song is "a continuous series of single, upslurred high-pitched 'tsee' notes".

== Status ==
The IUCN has assessed the needle-billed hermit as being of Least Concern, though its population size and trend are not known. It is generally thought to be locally common and occurs in some protected areas.
