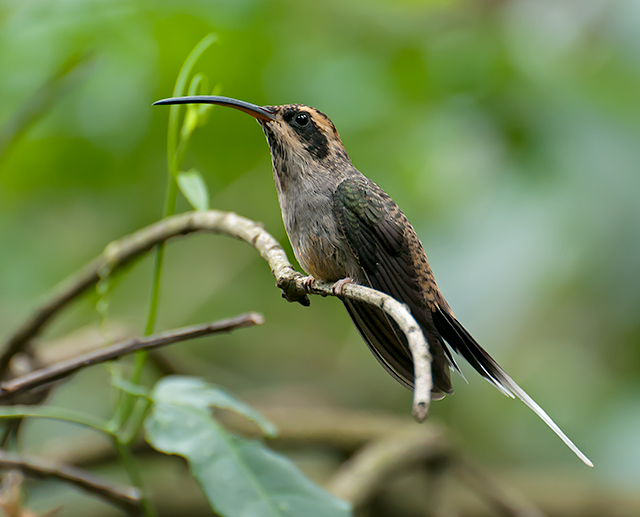

Conservation status
- Least Concern (IUCN 3.1)
- CITES Appendix II

Scientific classification
- Kingdom: Animalia
- Phylum: Chordata
- Class: Aves
- Order: Apodiformes
- Family: Trochilidae
- Genus: Phaethornis
- Species: P. eurynome

Binomial name
- Phaethornis eurynome (Lesson, 1832)

Synonyms
- Phaethornis nigrirostris Ruschi, 1973

= Scale-throated hermit =

Species of hummingbird

The scale-throated hermit (Phaethornis eurynome) is a species in the hummingbird family Trochilidae. It is found in Argentina, Brazil, and Paraguay.

== Taxonomy and systematics ==
Though the scale-throated hermit is a member of the large genus Phaethornis, it seems to have no close relatives. It has two subspecies, the nominate P. e. eurynome and P. e. paraguayensis. A third proposed subspecies, P. e. pinheiroi, has not been accepted by most taxonomists. The supposed "black-billed hermit", described as P. nigrirostris, was proven to be a mutant P. eurynome with an all-black bill.

== Description ==
The scale-throated hermit is about 14.0 to 14.5 cm (5.5 to 5.7 in) long. Males weigh 4.5 to 6.0 g (0.16 to 0.21 oz) and females weigh4.0 to 5.0 g (0.14 to 0.18 oz). This medium-sized hermit is olive green above with grayish underparts. Its dark throat, whose feathers have lighter edges, give the eponymous scaly appearance. The face has a black "mask" with a pale supercilium and gular stripe. Its tail feathers have white tips and the middle pair is longer than the others. The sexes are similar, but the female has shorter wings and a less strongly decurved bill. The two subspecies have identical plumage, but P. e. paraguayensis is significantly smaller than the nominate.

== Distribution and habitat ==
The nominate subspecies of scale-throated hermit is found in southeastern Brazil from southeastern Bahia south to Rio Grande do Sul. P. e. paraguayensis is found in eastern Paraguay and northeastern Angentina's Misiones Province. It inhabits the understory of a variety of landscapes within the Atlantic Forest biome, including lowland and montane rainforest, semideciduous forest, and mature secondary forest. In elevation, it has been recorded from 100 to 2,250 m (330 to 7,400 ft).

== Behavior ==
=== Movement ===
The scale-throated hermit is assumed to be sedentary, but data are lacking.

=== Feeding ===
The scale-throated hermit is a "trap-line" feeder like other hermit hummingbirds, visiting a circuit of a wide variety of flowering plants for nectar. It also consumes small arthropods.

=== Breeding ===
The scale-throated hermit's breeding season in Brazil spans from September to March, but it has not been defined in the rest of its range. Its nest is a long, cone-shaped cup made of plant fibers and spider web suspended under a long, drooping leaf. It is often decorated with the lichen Spiloma roseum that stains the eggs and nesting female red. The clutch of two eggs is incubated by the female alone.

=== Vocalization ===
The scale-throated hermit's song is variable, "but typically comprises tw to four notes, e.g. 'tsi-tseee....tsi-tseee..' or 'tsi-tsu-tseeé...tsi-tsu-tseeé...' etc." Its calls include "a plaintive 'tsew' and a more upslurred 'tsee'."

== Status ==
The IUCN has assessed the scale-throated hermit as being of least concern. Though its population size is unknown and believed to be decreasing, it is common throughout its range and occurs in several protected areas.
