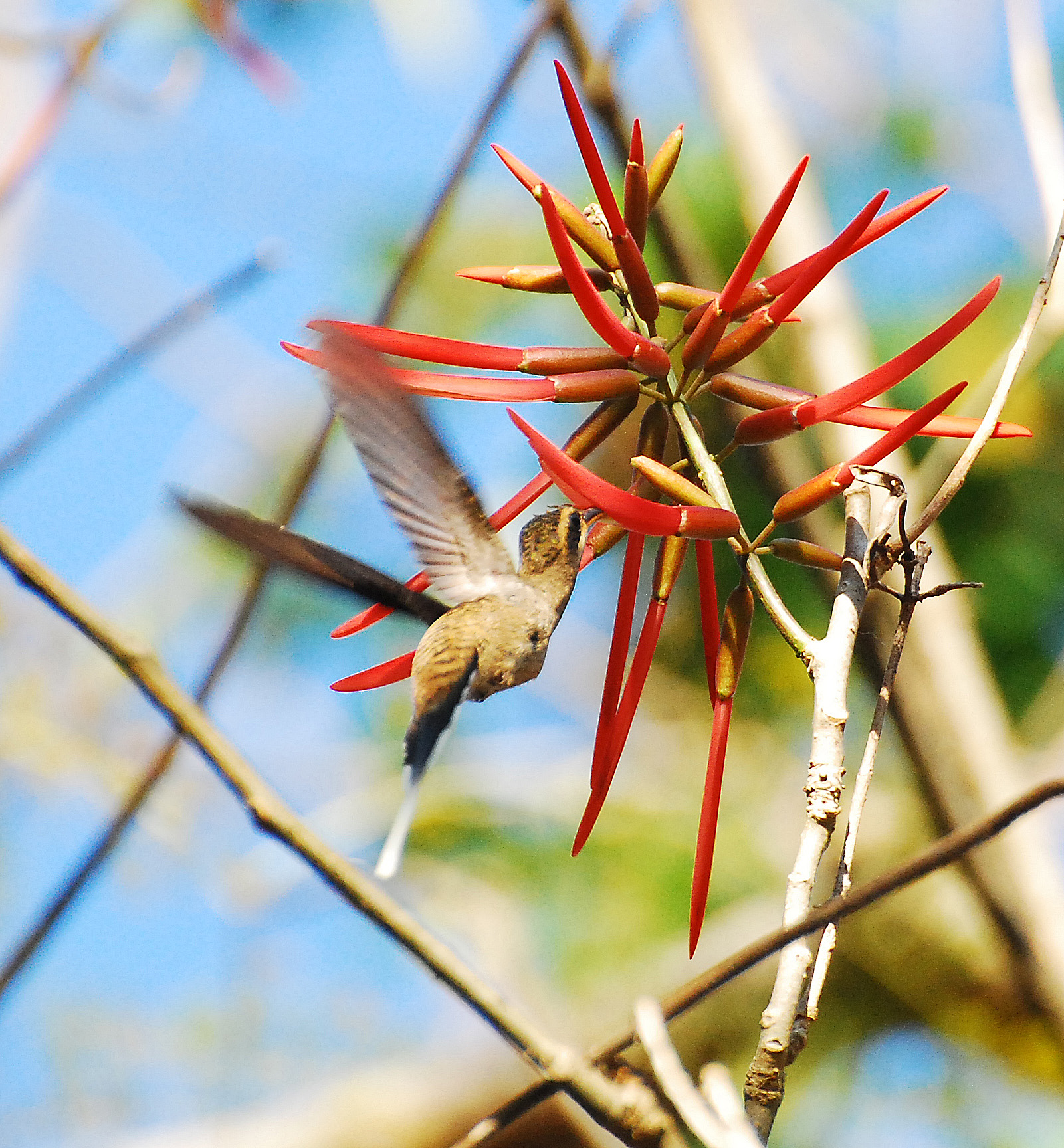
- Mexican hermit in Oaxaca

Conservation status
- Least Concern (IUCN 3.1)
- CITES Appendix II

Scientific classification
- Kingdom: Animalia
- Phylum: Chordata
- Class: Aves
- Order: Apodiformes
- Family: Trochilidae
- Genus: Phaethornis
- Species: P. mexicanus

Binomial name
- Phaethornis mexicanus Hartert, EJO, 1897

= Mexican hermit =

Species of hummingbird

The Mexican hermit (Phaethornis mexicanus) is a species of hummingbird in the family Trochilidae. It is endemic to Mexico.

== Taxonomy and systematics ==
The Mexican hermit was previously treated as a subspecies of the long-billed hermit (Phaethornis longirostris). Following two 2013 publications, the North American Classification Committee (NACC) of the American Ornithological Society in 2015 recognized it as a separate species. The International Ornithological Committee (IOC), the Clements taxonomy, and BirdLife International's Handbook of the Birds of the World followed suit.

The Mexican hermit has two subspecies, the nominate P. m. mexicanus and P. m. griseoventer.

== Description ==
The Mexican hermit is 16 to 17 cm (6.3 to 6.7 in) long. The nominate subspecies has a dusky crown and bronzy green nape and upperparts. The rump feathers are bronzy green with cinnamon edges and the tail is black with white tips to the feathers. The face has black cheeks and pale cinnamon stripes behind the eye and below the cheek. The throat is mostly pale buff and the rest of the underparts are dusky brownish gray with a cinnamon wash on the belly. P. m. griseoventer is slightly paler overall; its crown is dull greenish, its throat stripe whitish to pale buff, and it has more white on the central tail feathers.

== Distribution and habitat ==
The Mexican hermit is found in two separate areas of Mexico's Pacific coast. The nominate P. m. mexicanus occurs to the southwest from western Guerrero south to southeastern Oaxaca. P. m. griseoventer occurs further north, between Nayarit and Colima. The species inhabits the interior and edges of humid evergreen forest, Heliconia thickets, and ravines in semi-deciduous woodlands. In elevation it ranges from sea level to about 2,000 m (6,560 ft).

== Behavior ==
=== Movement ===
The Mexican hermit is believed to be sedentary.

=== Feeding ===
The Mexican hermit is a "trap-line" feeder like other hermit hummingbirds, visiting a circuit of a variety of flowering plants for nectar. It also consumes small arthropods.

=== Breeding ===
Almost nothing is known about the Mexican hermit's breeding phenology. Nests with eggs were found in late May and early July.

=== Vocalization ===
The song of the Mexican hermit's P. m. griseoventer subspecies is "a continuous series of single, metallic notes...'chieh...chieh...chieh...'." Its call is "a shrill, slurred, relatively drawn-out 'skweih'". The vocalizations of the nominate P. m. mexicanus have not been documented. However, both subspecies are known to sing at leks of four to six males.

== Status ==
The IUCN has assessed the Mexican hermit as being of Least Concern. Its population is estimated to be at least 20,000 mature individuals but is believed to be decreasing. No immediate threats have been identified.
