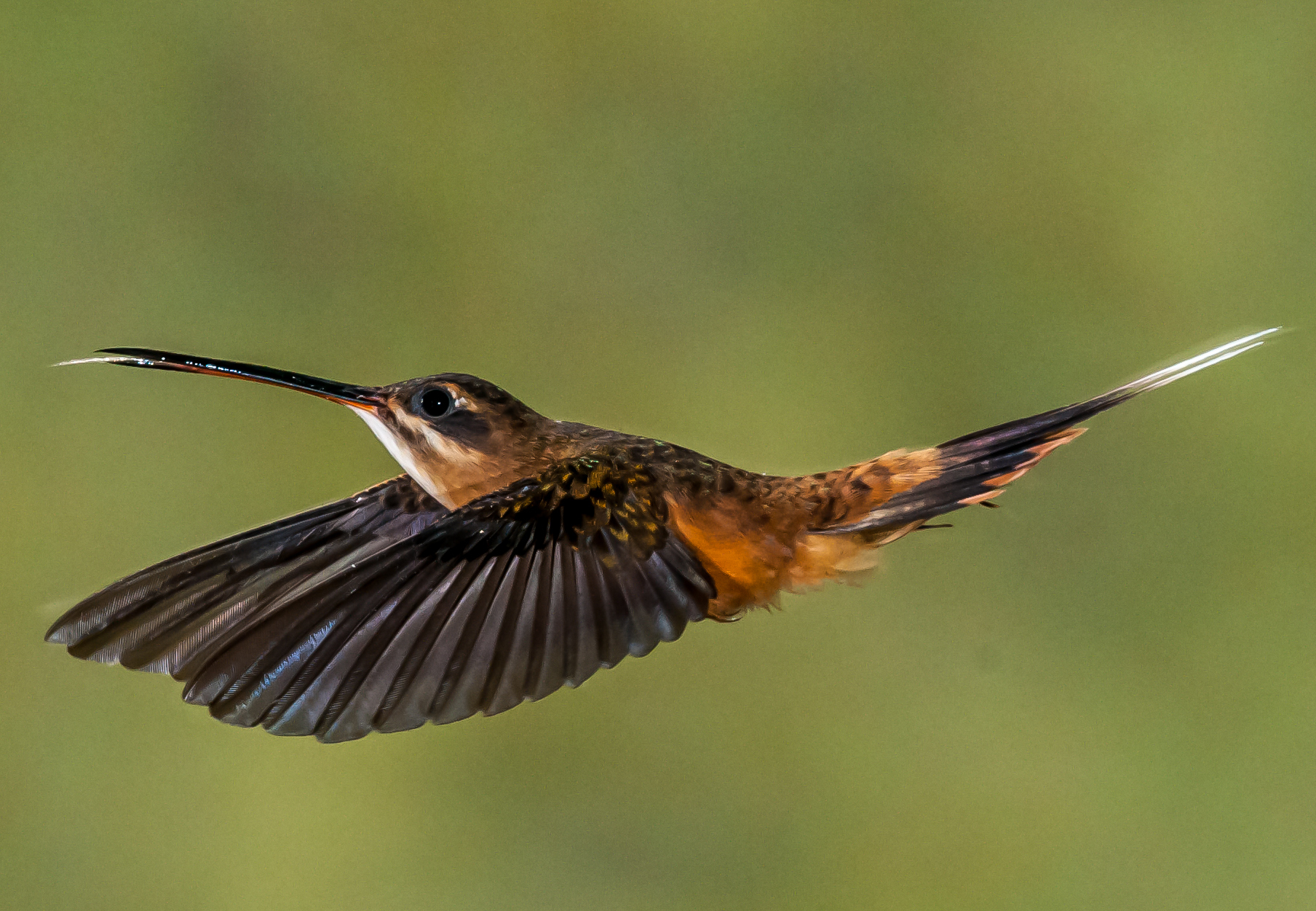

Conservation status
- Least Concern (IUCN 3.1)
- CITES Appendix II (CITES)

Scientific classification
- Kingdom: Animalia
- Phylum: Chordata
- Class: Aves
- Clade: Strisores
- Order: Apodiformes
- Family: Trochilidae
- Genus: Phaethornis
- Species: P. koepckeae

Binomial name
- Phaethornis koepckeae Weske & Terborgh, 1977

= Koepcke's hermit =

Species of hummingbird

Koepcke's hermit (Phaethornis koepckeae) is a species of hummingbird in the family Trochilidae. It is endemic to Peru.

== Taxonomy and systematics ==
Koepcke's hermit is monotypic. It and the needle-billed hermit (P. philippii) are sister species and may form a superspecies.

== Description ==
Koepcke's hermit is 14 to 15 cm (5.5 to 5.9 in) long. Males weigh 4.7 to 5.8 g (0.17 to 0.20 oz) and females 4.5 to 4.9 g (0.16 to 0.17 oz). It is one of the few hermit hummingbirds with a nearly straight bill. It has a blackish crown glossed with greenish, a glossy greenish bronze nape, a glossy bronze back, and a rufous rump. The tail is mostly dark glossy green. The innermost pair of tail feathers are longer than the others and have white tips; the others have broad buffy rufous tips. The face has a black "mask" bordered with narrow white streaks. The chin and throat are white, the center of the breast pale reddish buff with grayer sides, and the belly and flanks a rich reddish buff.

== Distribution and habitat ==
Koepcke's hermit is found on the eastern foothills of the Peruvian Andes from just south of the Marañón River in Amazonas south to central Madre de Dios. In elevation it ranges between 450 and 1,300 m (1,500 and 4,300 ft), and the distribution is patchy. It inhabits the understory of tall evergreen forest and humid montane forest. It generally shuns secondary forest.

== Behavior ==
=== Feeding ===
Koepcke's hermit is assumed to be a "trap-line" feeder like other hermit hummingbirds, visiting a circuit of a wide variety of flowering plants for nectar. It also consumes small arthropods.

=== Breeding ===
The breeding season of Koepcke's hermit has not been defined. It builds a conical nest suspended from the underside of the tip of a drooping leaf.

=== Vocalization ===
Koepcke's hermit's song is "a ringing, buzzy series of short notes: b'zee b'zee b'zee" Its calls include "a ringing, rising tchwee or tchwing and "a descending, accelerating series of high notes".

== Status ==
The IUCN has assessed Koepcke's hermit as Near Threatened. Its population is estimated to be between 6,000 and 15,000 mature individuals and decreasing. "It is threatened by rapid deforestation within its elevational range."
