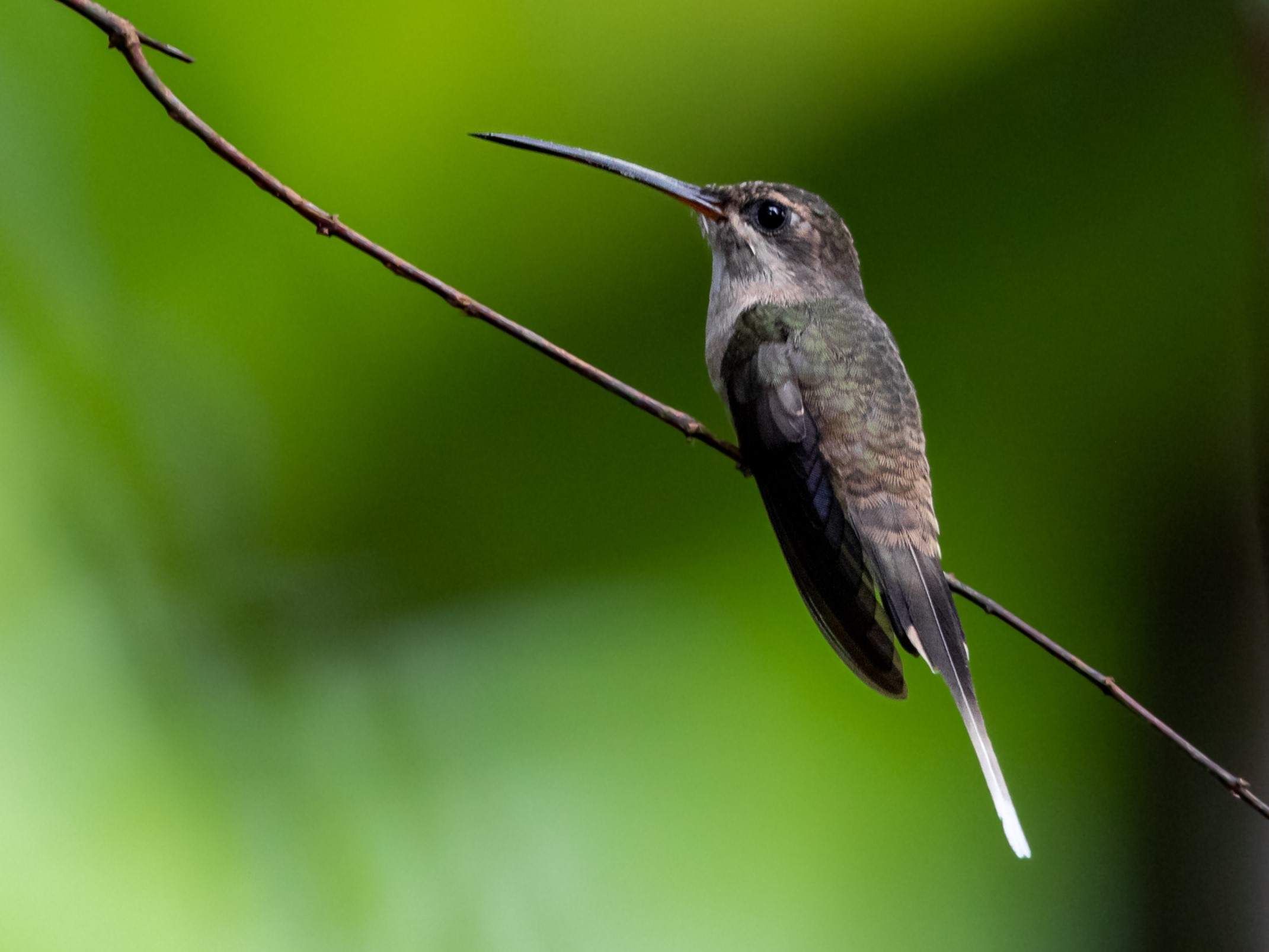
- Long-tailed Hermit Phaethornis superciliosus

Scientific classification
- Kingdom: Animalia
- Phylum: Chordata
- Class: Aves
- Clade: Strisores
- Order: Apodiformes
- Family: Trochilidae
- Subfamily: Phaethornithinae
- Genus: Phaethornis; Swainson, 1827

Type species
- Phaethornis superciliosus Linnaeus, 1766

Species
- See text

Synonyms
- Pygmornis

= Phaethornis =

Genus of birds

Phaethornis is a genus of hummingbirds in the hermit subfamily, Phaethornithinae. They occur from southern Mexico, through Central America, to South America as far south as northern Argentina.

== Taxonomy ==
The genus Phaethornis was introduced in 1827 by William Swainson with the long-tailed hermit as the type species. The name combines the Ancient Greek phaethōn meaning "sun" and ornis meaning "bird". The genus now contains 27 species.

The taxonomy of some groups have changed significantly in recent years, especially following the split of several small hermits (P. idaliae, P. atrimentalis and P. striigularis) previously considered subspecies of Phaethornis longuemareus, as well as the split of P. longirostris from P. superciliosus.

Further confusion exists between P. superciliosus and P. malaris: Most taxa previously considered subspecies of the former (bolivianus, insolitus, margarettae, moorei and ochraceiventris) are now placed with the latter. A fully satisfactory taxonomic treatment of the entire longirostris/malaris/superciliosus group is still lacking according to some Neotropical ornithologists.

Another such case is P. maranhaoensis: Some considered it invalid, believing it was the male plumage of P. nattereri. However, P. maranhaoensis only occurs in the northern part of the range of P. nattereri, and the two have different voices. Molecular work also confirms the validity of P. maranhaoensis, though details presently are lacking. Comparably, P. aethopyga has generally been considered invalid as believed to be a hybrid between P. ruber and P. rupurumii, but this assumption has recently been shown to be incorrect, leading to its revalidation as a distinct species. For the same authors, the taxa proposed as hybrids by Hinkelmann, could be valid taxa, especially P. longuemareus imatacae.

== Description and ecology ==
Their plumage typically involves greens, browns, rufous or grey. Most species show some green or bronze iridescence to the upperparts, but this is far less conspicuous than that of many other hummingbirds. The male and female plumages of hermits are very similar, with differences limited to details of bill-shape, tail-shape and/or strength of colours/patterns. No species of hermit show the strong sexual dimorphism usually associated with hummingbirds.

Phaethornis hermits typically have a long decurved bill, although three species, P. koepkeae, P. philippii and P. bourcieri have virtually straight bills. They have a red or yellow base to the lower mandible, and their two central tail feathers are elongated and tipped with white, buff or ochraceous. The crown of the head is flat, and two pale facial stripes enclose a dusky mask.

Most Phaethornis hermits are restricted to the edge and undergrowth of forest, woodland and second growth, but some species (e.g. P. pretrei) also occur in more open habitats.

Many species of hermits form leks and congregate on traditional display grounds, where females visit to choose a mate. However, male hermits are generally less aggressive than other male hummingbirds, though both sexes will defend a feeding territory.

Most hermits are associated with heliconias, but will utilize other nectar sources like flowers of Centropogon, Passiflora, Costus, etc. To a lesser degree, they will capture small arthropods. The long, decurved bills typical of most members of this group of hummingbirds are an adaptation to certain flowers.

=== Species in taxonomic order ===
| Image | Common name | Scientific name | Distribution |
|---|---|---|---|
| | Dusky-throated hermit | Phaethornis squalidus | Atlantic Forest in south-eastern Brazil. |
| | Streak-throated hermit | Phaethornis rupurumii | south-eastern Venezuela, west-central Guyana, and the extreme northern Brazil Amazon Basin |
| | Tapajós hermit | Phaethornis aethopygus | south-eastern Amazon in Brazil |
| | Little hermit | Phaethornis longuemareus | north-eastern Venezuela, northern Guyana, Suriname, French Guiana and Trinidad. |
| | Minute hermit | Phaethornis idaliae | humid Atlantic Forest in south-eastern Brazil, ranging from Rio de Janeiro north to south-eastern Bahia |
| | Cinnamon-throated hermit | Phaethornis nattereri | Amazon Rainforest from far north-eastern Bolivia north-east to Maranhão in Brazil. |
| | Black-throated hermit | Phaethornis atrimentalis | western Amazon in Colombia, Ecuador, and Peru |
| | Stripe-throated hermit | Phaethornis striigularis | southern Mexico, Central America, Tumbes–Chocó–Magdalena to Cordillera de Mérida and Venezuelan Coastal Range ; Sierra Nevada de Santa Marta |
| | Grey-chinned hermit | Phaethornis griseogularis | Colombia, Ecuador, Peru, Venezuela, and - marginally - far northern Brazil |
| | Reddish hermit | Phaethornis ruber | Bolivia, Brazil, Colombia, Ecuador, Peru, Venezuela, and in the Guianas. |
| | White-browed hermit | Phaethornis stuarti | Bolivia and Peru. |
| | Buff-bellied hermit | Phaethornis subochraceus | Bolivia and Brazil. |
| | Sooty-capped hermit | Phaethornis augusti | Venezuela, Colombia, Guyana and Brazil |
| | Planalto hermit | Phaethornis pretrei | eastern and south-central Brazil, eastern Bolivia, Paraguay, and marginally in north-western Argentina. |
| | Scale-throated hermit | Phaethornis eurynome | north-eastern Argentina, south-eastern Brazil, and eastern Paraguay |
| | Pale-bellied hermit | Phaethornis anthophilus | Colombia, Panama, and Venezuela |
| | White-bearded hermit | Phaethornis hispidus | Bolivia, Brazil, Colombia, Ecuador, Peru, and Venezuela. |
| | White-whiskered hermit | Phaethornis yaruqui | Colombia and Ecuador. |
| | Green hermit | Phaethornis guy | southern Central America (Costa Rica and Panama) south to northern South America (north-eastern Venezuela and Trinidad, and the northern Andes of eastern Peru) |
| | Tawny-bellied hermit | Phaethornis syrmatophorus | Colombia, Ecuador, and Peru |
| | Koepcke's hermit | Phaethornis koepckeae | Peru. |
| | Needle-billed hermit | Phaethornis philippii | western Brazil, Peru and northwestern Bolivia |
| | Straight-billed hermit | Phaethornis bourcieri | Guyanas of Guyana, Suriname, and French Guiana; also the northern Amazon basin of Brazil, and Amazonian Colombia, Ecuador, and Peru |
| | Long-billed hermit or western long-tailed hermit | Phaethornis longirostris | central Mexico south to northwestern Colombia, extreme western Venezuela and western Ecuador. |
| | Mexican hermit | Phaethornis mexicanus | Mexico |
| | (Eastern) long-tailed hermit | Phaethornis superciliosus | Venezuela, the Guianas, and north-eastern Brazil. |
| | Great-billed hermit | Phaethornis malaris | Bolivia, Brazil, Colombia, Ecuador, French Guiana, Peru, Suriname, and Venezuela. |
