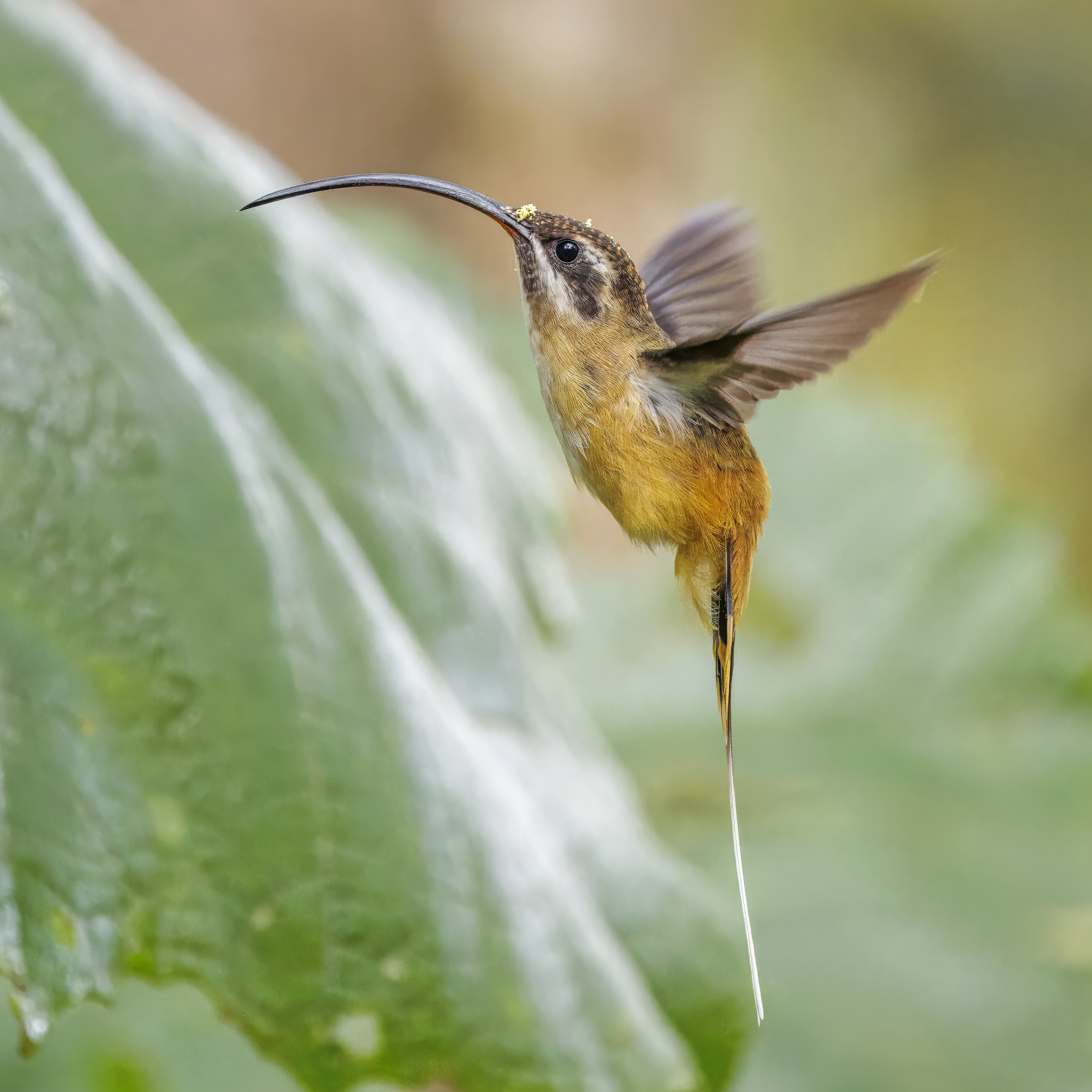
- San Isidro Lodge, Ecuador

Conservation status
- Least Concern (IUCN 3.1)
- CITES Appendix II (CITES)

Scientific classification
- Kingdom: Animalia
- Phylum: Chordata
- Class: Aves
- Clade: Strisores
- Order: Apodiformes
- Family: Trochilidae
- Genus: Phaethornis
- Species: P. syrmatophorus

Binomial name
- Phaethornis syrmatophorus Gould, 1852

= Tawny-bellied hermit =

Species of hummingbird

The tawny-bellied hermit (Phaethornis syrmatophorus) is a species of hummingbird in the family Trochilidae. It is found in Colombia, Ecuador, and Peru.

== Taxonomy and systematics ==
Two subspecies of the tawny-bellied hermit are recognised, the nominate P. s. syrmatophorus (Gould, 1852) and P. s. columbianus (Boucard, 1891). Two others have been proposed, P. s. berlepschi and P. s. huallagae. The former was based on a specimen of an immature nominate and the latter cannot be distinguished from the nominate.

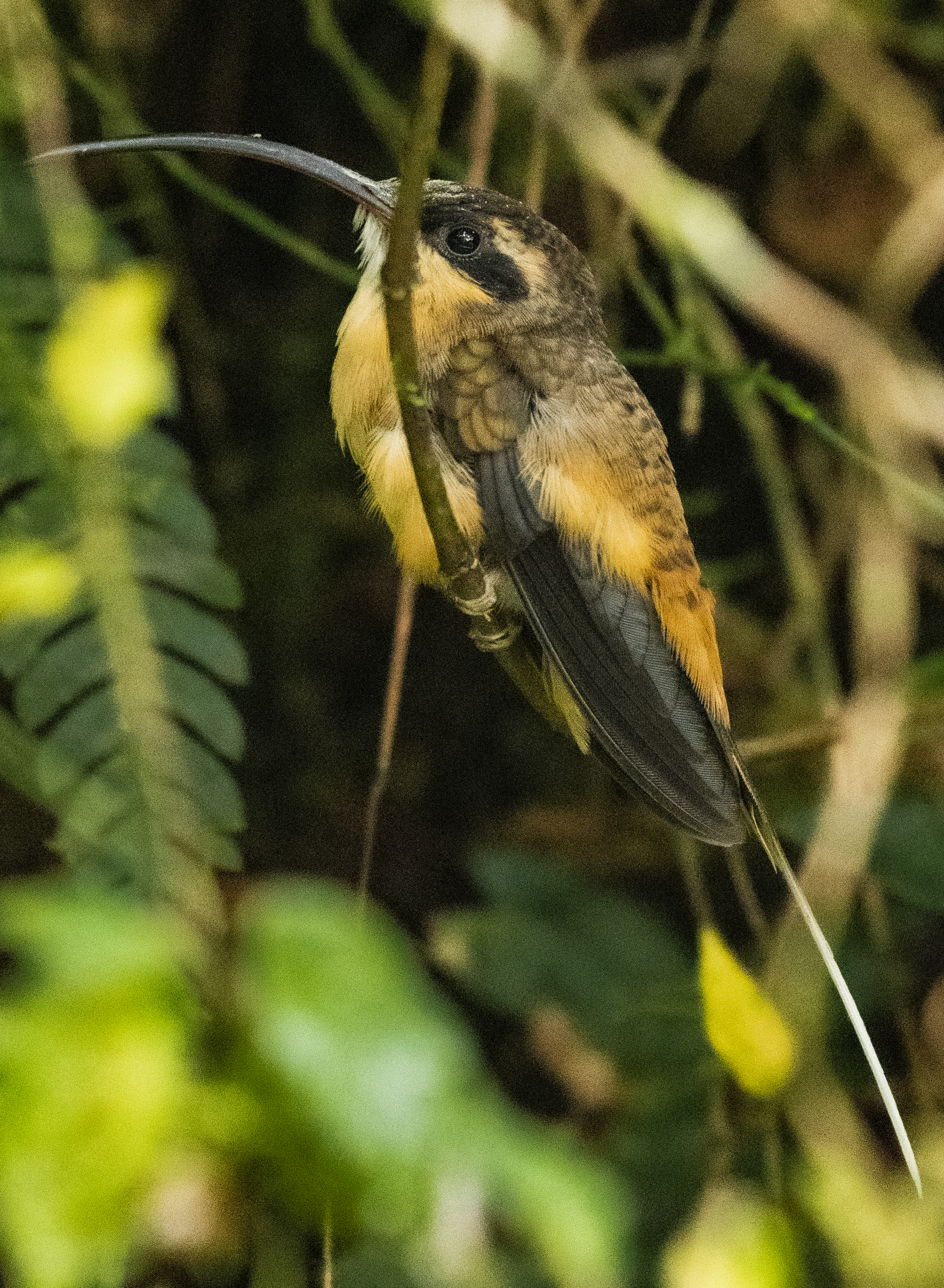
Tawny-bellied hermit in the Bellavista Cloud Forest Reserve, Ecuador

== Description ==
The tawny-bellied hermit is about 14 cm (5.5 in) long and weighs 5 to 7 g (0.18 to 0.25 oz). This medium-sized hermit's upperparts are olive green, and males have reddish-orange uppertail coverts. The central tail feathers of both sexes are long and white and the rest are dark with bright orange ends. The nominate subspecies has an orange throat, belly, and undertail coverts; the throat and chest of P. s. columbianus are dark brown. Both sexes have an obviously decurved bill with the female's being more curved than the male's.

== Distribution and habitat ==
The nominate subspecies of tawny-bellied hermit is found in the Western Andes of Colombia (including the valleys of the Cauca and Patía rivers) and locally south on the western Andean slope through Ecuador to western Loja Province. P. s. columbianus is found in the Central and Eastern Andes of Colombia (including the southern Magdalena River valley) and south on the Andes' eastern slope through Ecuador to northern Peru's San Martín Department. It principally inhabits the understory of humid montane forest but is also found at forest edges and in dense secondary forest. In elevation it mostly ranges between 1,000 and 2,300 m (3,300 and 7,500 ft) though it has been recorded as low as 750 m (2,500 ft) and as high as 3,100 m (10,000 ft). The white-whiskered hermit (P. yaruqui) replaces it in similar habitats below 1,000 m (3,300 ft).

== Behavior ==
=== Movement ===
The tawny-bellied hermit is believed to be sedentary.

=== Feeding ===
The tawny-bellied hermit is a "trap-line" feeder like other hermit hummingbirds, visiting a circuit of a wide variety of flowering plants for nectar. It also consumes small arthropods.

=== Breeding ===
The tawny-bellied hermit's breeding seasons across its range have not been determined in detail but seem to be in the March to August window and possibly also in December. The nest is a cone-shaped cup constructed of leaves and vegetable fibers bound with spider silk and suspended from the underside tip of a drooping leaf. The clutch size is two eggs.

=== Vocalization ===
The tawny-bellied hermit's song is "a continuous series of single, high-pitched, almost insect-like 'tsi' calls". Several males often sing at a lek. The species also gives flight calls of "an upslurred 'peeet!'" and "a soft 'stip'".

== Status ==
The IUCN has assessed the tawny-bellied hermit as being of Least Concern, though its population size is unknown and believed to be decreasing. It is found in some protected areas, but "habitat loss may be a severe threat in the future."
