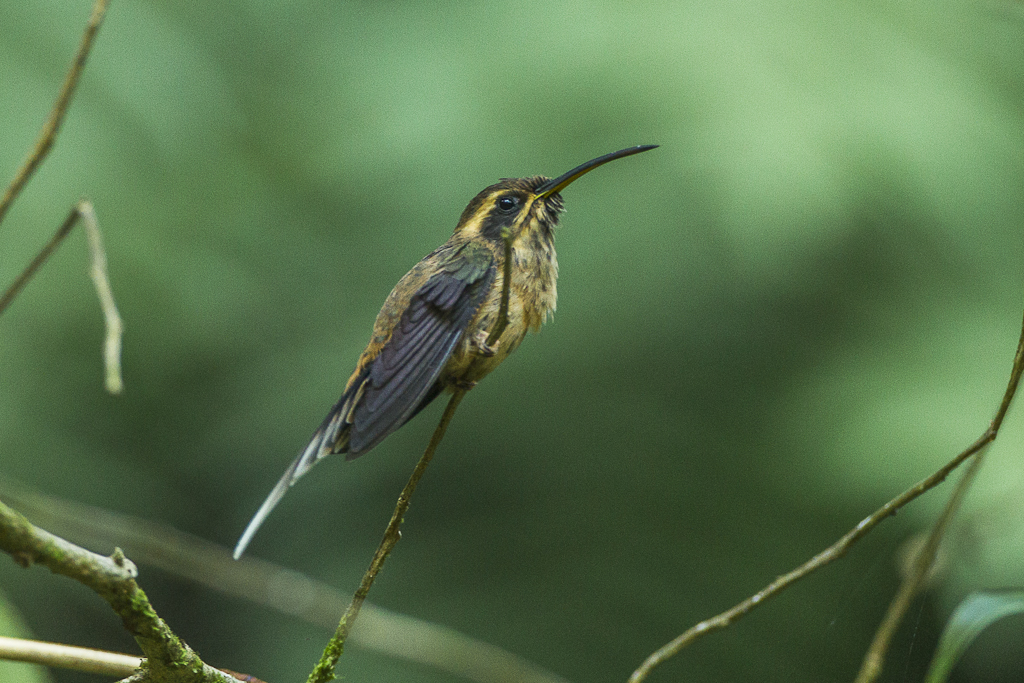

Conservation status
- Least Concern (IUCN 3.1)
- CITES Appendix II

Scientific classification
- Kingdom: Animalia
- Phylum: Chordata
- Class: Aves
- Order: Apodiformes
- Family: Trochilidae
- Genus: Phaethornis
- Species: P. squalidus

Binomial name
- Phaethornis squalidus (Temminck, 1822)

= Dusky-throated hermit =

Species of hummingbird

The dusky-throated hermit (Phaethornis squalidus) is a species of hummingbird in the family Trochilidae. It is endemic to Brazil.

== Taxonomy and systematics ==
The dusky-throated hermit has sometimes included what is now (2021) the streak-throated hermit (P. rupurumii), but it is now treated as monotypic.

== Description ==
The dusky-throated hermit is 10 to 12.5 cm (3.9 to 4.9 in) long and weighs 2.5 to 3.5 g (0.088 to 0.12 oz). A medium-sized hermit hummingbird, it is generally brownish with a greenish back and ochraceous underparts and has a black "mask," white supercilium, malar stripe, and a dark brown throat. The sexes are generally alike, though the female may have paler underparts and a slightly more decurved bill.

== Distribution and habitat ==
The dusky-throated hermit is found in southeastern Brazil, mostly from southern Minas Gerais and Espírito Santo south to Santa Catarina, and also in the Iguazu Falls area of western Paraná. It inhabits the understory of humid primary and secondary forests from the littoral zone to an elevation of 2,250 m (7,400 ft).

== Behavior ==
=== Movement ===
The dusky-throated hermit is believed to be sedentary.

=== Feeding ===
The dusky-throated hermit feeds on nectar and also on small arthropods, but details of its diet and foraging technique have not been published.

=== Breeding ===
The dusky-throated hermit's breeding season spans from October to February. The female alone incubates a clutch size of two eggs within its cone-shaped cup nest suspended from the underside of a drooping leaf.

=== Vocalization ===
The dusky-throated hermit's song is "a complex warbling high-pitched phrase repeated continuously...e.g. 'tsi-teeé-tsa-tsa-tseé-CHAW-CHAW'." Its call is "a high-pitched 'tsee!'."

== Status ==
The IUCN has assessed the dusky-throated hermit as being of Least Concern, though its population size and trend are unknown. "Continuing destruction of rainforest may present a major threat in [the] future."
