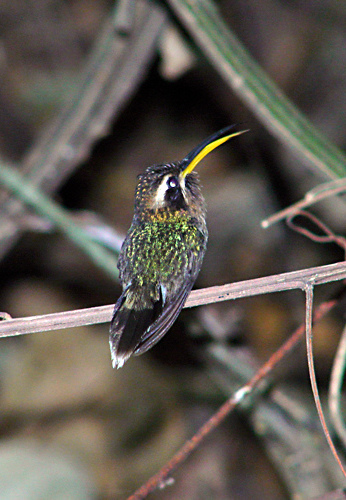

Conservation status
- Least Concern (IUCN 3.1)
- CITES Appendix II

Scientific classification
- Kingdom: Animalia
- Phylum: Chordata
- Class: Aves
- Order: Apodiformes
- Family: Trochilidae
- Genus: Phaethornis
- Species: P. idaliae

Binomial name
- Phaethornis idaliae (Bourcier & Mulsant, 1856)

= Minute hermit =

Species of hummingbird

The minute hermit (Phaethornis idaliae) is a tiny species of hummingbird in the family Trochilidae. It is endemic to Brazil.

== Taxonomy and systematics ==
The minute hermit was for a time considered conspecific with the little hermit (P. longuemareus) and now is treated with it as a superspecies. It is monotypic.

== Description ==
The minute hermit is one of the world's smallest birds. It is 8.4 to 9.2 cm (3.31 to 3.62 in) long and weighs 1.8 to 2.7 g (0.06 to 0.10 oz). The male has dark iridescent green upperparts and a dark brown throat. The female's underparts are reddish orange. Both sexes have a black "mask" and a pale supercilium and malar stripe.

== Distribution and habitat ==
The minute hermit is found in southeastern Brazil from approximately Bahia south to Rio de Janeiro state. It inhabits the understory of primary or lightly disturbed forest including their edges, and also mature secondary forest and forested islands. It has been recorded in Eucalyptus plantations near its preferred habitat. In elevation it ranges from sea level to 500 m (1,640 ft).

== Behavior ==
=== Movement ===
The minute hermit is assumed to be sedentary.

=== Feeding ===
The minute hermit is a "trap-line" feeder like other hermit hummingbirds, visiting a circuit of flowering plants for nectar. It also consumes small arthropods.

=== Breeding ===
The minute hermit's breeding season spans from October to February. Males display to females at leks. Its nest is an open cup suspended from the underside of a drooping leaf. The clutch of two eggs is incubated solely by the female.

=== Vocalization ===
The minute hermit's song is "a high-pitched note repeated 3–4 times, followed by an accelerated descending warble" sung from a low perch.

== Status ==
The IUCN has assessed the minute hermit as being of Least Concern, though its population size is unknown and believed to be decreasing. It has a very restricted range in the Atlantic Forest, a habitat that has almost entirely been deforested. It does occur in a few protected areas.
