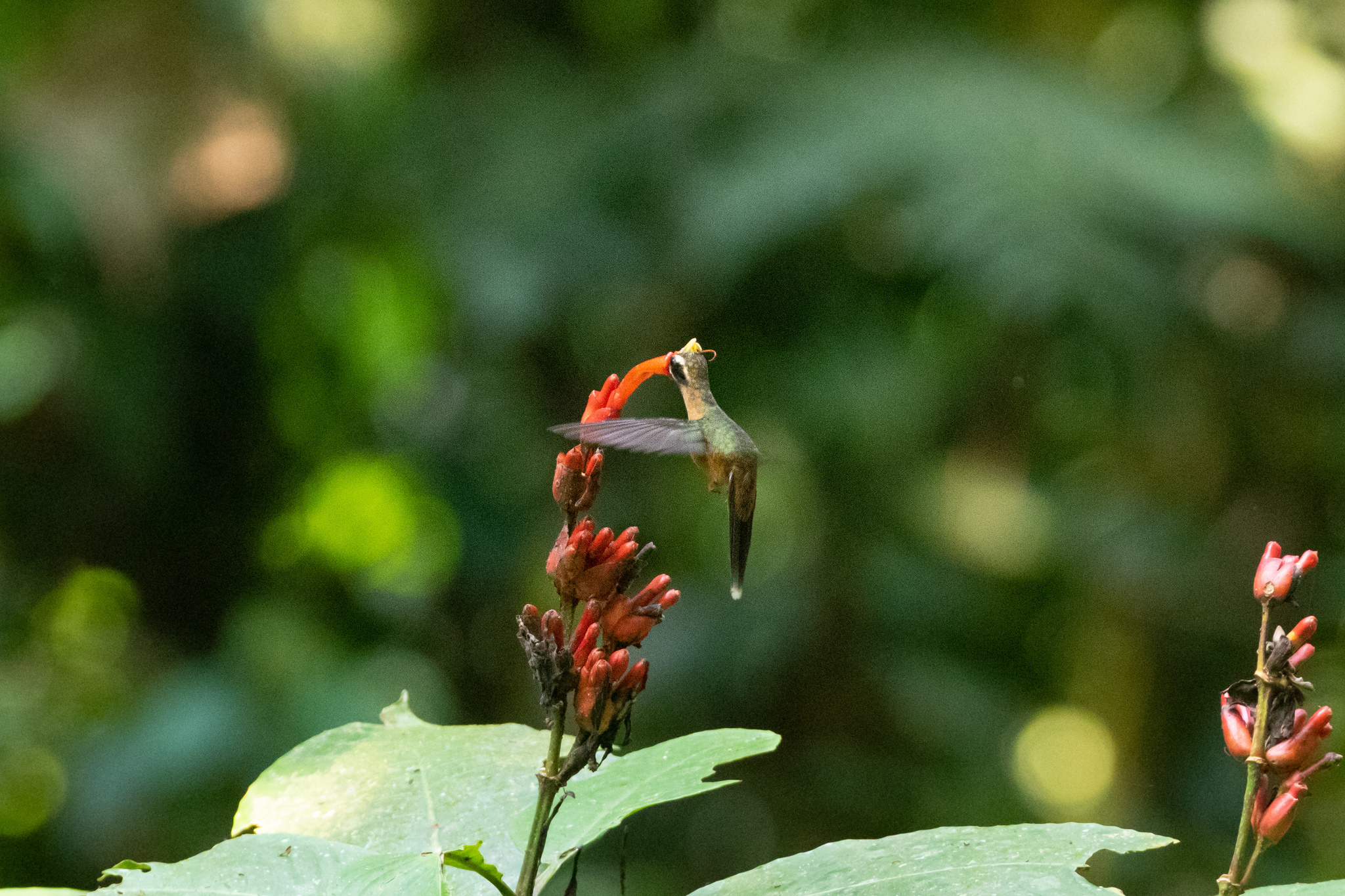

Conservation status
- Least Concern (IUCN 3.1)
- CITES Appendix II

Scientific classification
- Kingdom: Animalia
- Phylum: Chordata
- Class: Aves
- Order: Apodiformes
- Family: Trochilidae
- Genus: Phaethornis
- Species: P. atrimentalis

Binomial name
- Phaethornis atrimentalis Lawrence, 1858

= Black-throated hermit =

Species of hummingbird

The black-throated hermit (Phaethornis atrimentalis) is a species of hummingbird in the family Trochilidae. It is found in Colombia, Ecuador, and Peru.

== Taxonomy and systematics ==
The black-throated hermit was for a time considered a subspecies of little hermit (P. longuemareus), but is more closely related to the reddish hermit (P. ruber) and grey-chinned hermit (P. griseogularis). It has two subspecies, the nominate P. a. atrimentalis and P. a. riojae.

== Description ==
The black-chinned hermit is about 9 to 10 cm (3.5 to 3.9 in) long, with P. a. riojae being larger than the nominate. The species has generally greenish upperparts with a reddish rump and a white-tipped dark tail. The throat is dark brown and the rest of the underparts cinnamon red but for whitish undertail coverts. Males often have a dark band between the throat and breast. Females are similar to males but their throat is lighter and they generally have longer wings.

== Distribution and habitat ==
The nominate subspecies of black-chinned hermit is found in the eastern Andes of Colombia, Ecuador, and northern Peru's Loreto department. P. a. riojae is found further south, in central Peru between the departments of San Martín and Pasco. The species inhabits the understory of rainforest (especially it edges), secondary forest, and more open landscapes such as plantations and swamp forest. It is mostly a bird of the lowlands but is found as high as 1,500 m (4,900 ft) south of Peru's Marañón River.

== Behavior ==
=== Movement ===
The black-throated hermit is believed to be sedentary.

=== Feeding ===
The black-throated hermit is a "trap-line" feeder like other hermit hummingbirds, visiting a circuit of flowering plants of many species for nectar. It also consumes small arthropods.

=== Breeding ===
The black-throated hermit's breeding phenology has not been documented. Observations indicate that its breeding season includes July and November in Peru and September in Ecuador.

=== Vocalization ===
The black-throated hermit's song is "a high-pitched phrase repeated incessantly without pauses between phrases...e.g. 'tsee ... tsee ... tsee ... tsee .. tseeetew'." Its call is "a high-pitched 'pseep!'" that is usually given in flight.

== Status ==
The IUCN has assessed the black-throated hermit as being of Least Concern, though its population size has not been determined and is believed to be decreasing. It is found in a few protected areas.
