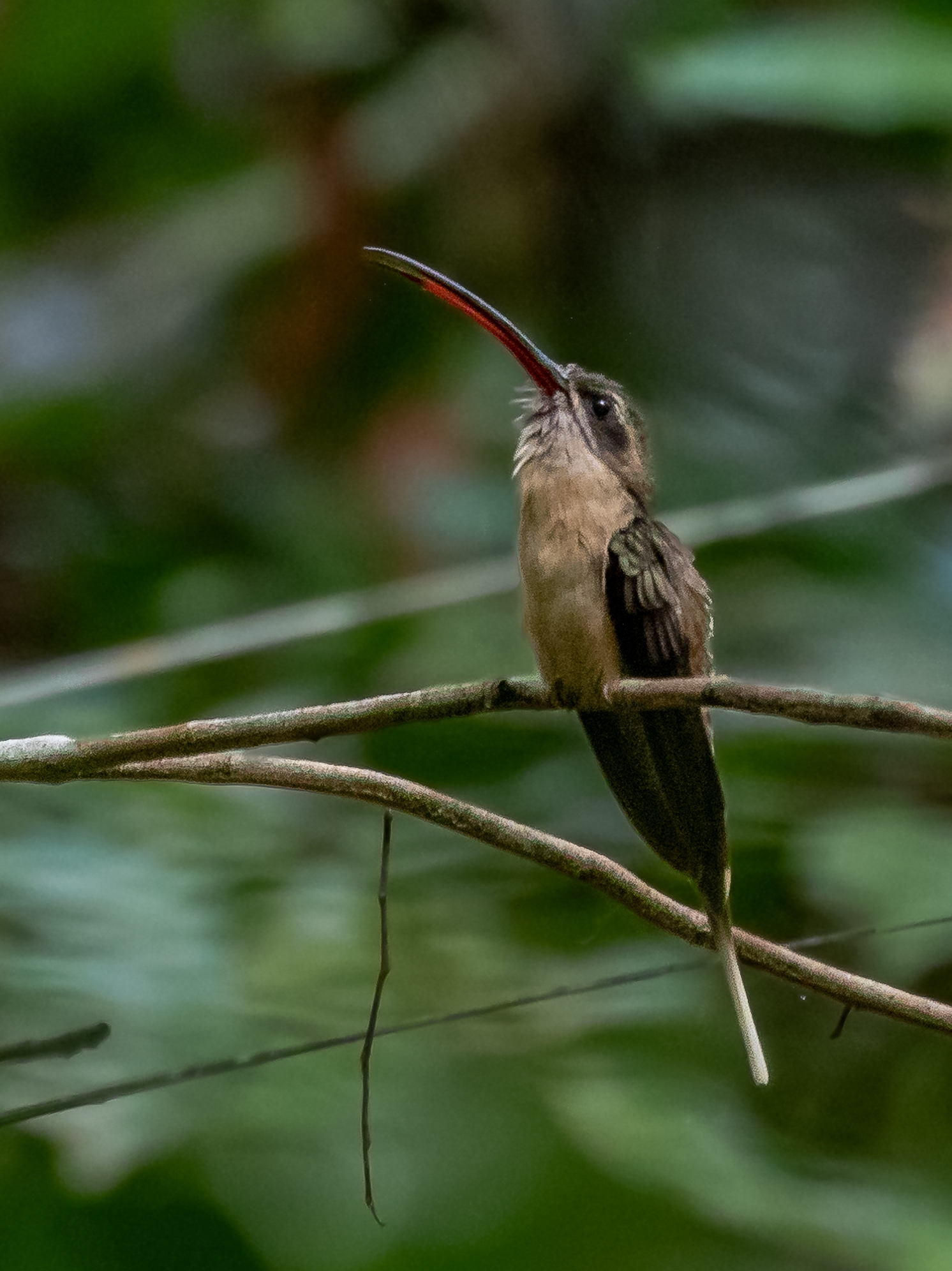

Conservation status
- Least Concern (IUCN 3.1)
- CITES Appendix II

Scientific classification
- Kingdom: Animalia
- Phylum: Chordata
- Class: Aves
- Clade: Strisores
- Order: Apodiformes
- Family: Trochilidae
- Genus: Phaethornis
- Species: P. malaris

Binomial name
- Phaethornis malaris (Nordmann, 1835)

= Great-billed hermit =

Species of hummingbird

The great-billed hermit (Phaethornis malaris) is a species of hummingbird in the family Trochilidae. It is found in Bolivia, Brazil, Colombia, Ecuador, French Guiana, Peru, Suriname, and Venezuela.

== Taxonomy and systematics ==
The great-billed hermit's taxonomy is confusing. What are now the long-billed hermit (P. longirostris) and long-tailed hermit (P. superciliosus) were considered conspecific and included many subspecies that are now assigned to the great-billed hermit. A satisfactory taxonomic treatment of the entire P. longirostris/P. superciliosus/P. malaris group is still lacking according to some Neotropical ornithologists.

These six subspecies of great-billed hermit are generally recognized:

- P. m. malaris Nordmann (1835)
- P. m. insolitus Zimmer (1950)
- P. m. moorei Lawrence (1858)
- P. m. ochraceiventris Hellmayr (1907)
- P. m. bolivianus Gould (1861)
- P. m. margarettae Ruschi (1972)

The subspecies P. m. margarettae is sometimes treated as a separate species, "Margaretta's hermit" (P. margarettae), and P. m. ochraceiventris has also been considered for species rank. At least two other populations within the existing subspecies have been suggested as additional subspecies.

== Description ==
The great-billed hermit is 13 to 17.5 cm (5.1 to 6.9 in) long. Males weigh 4.5 to 10 g (0.16 to 0.35 oz) and females 4 to 8 g (0.14 to 0.28 oz). The nominate subspecies is the largest. It has greenish-brown upperparts and brownish to grayish underparts. Its uppertail coverts have dark and light ochre bands and the central tail feathers are long with long white tips. It has a long decurved bill, with the female's being shorter but more curved than the male's. P. m. insolitus is smaller than the nominate but otherwise similar. P. m. moorei has paler, grayer, underparts than the nominate. P. m. bolivianus and P. m. margarettae are the smallest subspecies. The former has a dark brown throat and breast and an orange-ochre belly; P. m. margarettae is very similar to bolivianus but has paler underparts. P. m. ochraceiventris has a bright orange breast and belly.

== Distribution and habitat ==
The subspecies of great-billed hermit are found thus:

- P. m. malaris, Suriname, French Guiana, and north central Brazil's Amapá state
- P. m. insolitus, eastern Colombia, southern Venezuela, and the northwestern part of Brazil's Amazonas state
- P. m. moorei, eastern and southern Colombia through eastern Ecuador into northeastern Peru as far as the Marañón River
- P. m. ochraceiventris, northeastern Peru south of the Marañón River east into western Brazil south of the Amazon River as far as the Madeira River
- P. m. bolivianus, southeastern Peru to central Bolivia and into western Brazil between the Madeira and Tapajós rivers
- P. m. margarettae, coastal eastern Brazil from Pernambuco south to Espírito Santo

The subspecies inhabit the understory of a variety of rainforest landscapes including terra firme, foothill, and higher elevation tropical forest; transitional forest; secondary forest; and bamboo thickets. P. m. ochraceiventris in addition is found in igapó forest. In most areas it is found below 600 m (2,000 ft) of elevation but occurs as high as 1,500 m (4,900 ft) in Colombia and 2,400 m (7,900 ft) in Bolivia.

== Behavior ==
=== Feeding ===
The great-billed hermit is a "trap-line" feeder like other hermit hummingbirds, visiting a circuit of a variety of flowering plants for nectar. Examples include Heliconia and Pitcairnia. It also consumes small arthropods.

=== Breeding ===
The great-billed hermit's breeding seasons vary across its range, for instance at least August to December in French Guiana, June to September in Bolivia, and June to November in Peru. Like most hermits, it builds a cone-shaped nest of plant fibers and spider silk suspended from the underside of a drooping leaf. The clutch size is two eggs.

=== Vocalization ===
The great-billed hermit's song is generally "a continuous series of single, bisyllablic rising, falling 'slee-up' notes" that differs somewhat among the subspecies. It also makes "a sharp 'skweep!'" call, usually in flight.

== Status ==
The IUCN has assessed the great-billed hermit as being of Least Concern, though its population size is not known and is believed to be decreasing. However, "[subspecies] margarettae, limited to forest remnants in [eastern] Brazil, could be threatened by further habitat destruction."
