= Grey-chinned hermit =

Conservation status
- Least Concern (IUCN 3.1)
- CITES Appendix II

Scientific classification
- Kingdom: Animalia
- Phylum: Chordata
- Class: Aves
- Order: Apodiformes
- Family: Trochilidae
- Genus: Phaethornis
- Species: P. griseogularis

Binomial name
- Phaethornis griseogularis Gould, 1851

Synonyms
- Phaethornis porcullae

Audio

Species of hummingbird

The grey-chinned hermit (Phaethornis griseogularis) is a species of hummingbird in the family Trochilidae. It is native to the tepuis and northern Andes.

== Taxonomy and systematics ==
The South American Classification Committee (SACC) of the American Ornithological Society, the International Ornithological Committee (IOC), and the Clements taxonomy assign three subspecies to the grey-chinned hermit, the nominate P. g. griseogularis, P. g. zonura, and P. g. porcullae. BirdLife International's Handbook of the Birds of the World elevates the last to species status, the "porculla hermit" (P. porcullae).

== Description ==
The nominate P. g. griseogularis and P. g. zonura subspecies of grey-chinned hermit are 8 to 10 cm (3.1 to 3.9 in) long; males weigh 1.8 to 2.5 g (0.06 to 0.09 oz) and females 1.9 to 3 g (0.07 to 0.11 oz). P. g. porcullae is about 10.5 cm (4.1 in) long and weighs about 2.5 g (0.09 oz). It also has longer wings than the other two subspecies. All three subspecies have generally greenish upperparts, a cinnamon red rump, and dark tail feathers with white tips. Males have a grayish throat and cinnamon red underparts, often with a black band across the chest. Male P. g. zonura is paler than the nominate, with more grayish underparts and a more decurved bill. P. g. porcullae is even paler than the other two subspecies and has more white in the tail. Females of all three subspecies are paler versions of the males.

== Distribution and habitat ==
P. g. griseogularis is found in the eastern Andes from Colombia south through eastern Ecuador into northern Peru as far as San Martín department, and also in south and southeastern Venezuela and on several isolated mountains in adjacent northern Brazil. There are a few records in the western Andes of Colombia. P. g. zonura is found in the valley of the Marañón River of northern Peru, in eastern Cajamarca and adjacent Amazonas departments. P. g. porcullae is found from the western Andes of southwestern Ecuador's province of Loja into northern Peru's departments of Tumbes, Piura, and Lambayeque.

The subspecies of grey-chinned hermit have somewhat different habitat preferences, but the common feature is dense growth, whether of cloudforest understory, secondary forest, or forest edges. P. g. griseogularis adds gallery forest. It usually occurs between 600 and 1,800 m (2,000 and 5,900 ft) of elevation but is found below 400 m (1,300 ft) in eastern Colombia, as high as 2,200 m (7,200 ft) in Peru, and as low as 300 m (980 ft) in Venezuela. P. g. zonura prefers drier woodland. It too usually occurs between 600 and 1,800 m (2,000 and 5,900 ft). P. g. porcullae inhabits humid woodland and moist areas within otherwise seasonally dry forest. In elevation it ranges from 400 to 1,600 m (1,300 to 5,200 ft) in Peru and from 900 to 2,000 m (3,000 to 6,600 ft) in Ecuador.

== Behavior ==
=== Movement ===
All subspecies of grey-chinned hermit are presumed to be sedentary.

=== Feeding ===
The grey-chinned hermit subspecies P. g. griseogularis and P. g. zonura are known to be "trap-line" feeders like other hermit hummingbirds, visiting a circuit of flowering plants for nectar. They also consume small arthropods. P. g. porcullae is assumed to have a similar feeding strategy and diet.

=== Breeding ===
The grey-chinned hermit is known to congregate at leks, at least during part of the year. The subspecies' breeding seasons are not well defined, but that of P. g. griseogularis includes October, that of P. g. zonura includes March, and that of P. g. porcullae appears to span at least from January to June. The only described nest is of P. g. porcullae; it was a cup made of moss, seed down, and other plant material suspended from the underside of a long drooping leaf. It contained two eggs, both of which hatched. The other two subspecies' nests are assumed to be similar.

=== Vocalization ===
The songs of P. g. griseogularis and P. g. zonura are "high-pitched series of notes repeated incessantly without pauses between phrases...several, evenly-spaced, slightly rising, single notes followed by a more complex warble, e.g. 'tsi ... tsee ... tseeé ... tseotsetsee'." Their call is "an explosive 'tseek!' that is mostly given in flight. The song of P. g. porcullae has a similar structure than that of the other subspecies, but its "notes [are] purer and higher-pitched". In addition to vocalizations, the species also has an audible wing whir or buzz.

== Status ==
The IUCN follows HBW taxonomy and so treats the "grey-chinned" and "porculla" hermits separately. The organization assesses both as being of Least Concern, though the population size of neither is known and both are believed to be decreasing. The nominate subspecies is believed to be reasonably common, but the relatively small range of P. g. zonura "could be cause for future concern". P. g. porcullae is also described as "fairly common" but it too has a rather limited range. It is found in several protected areas.
