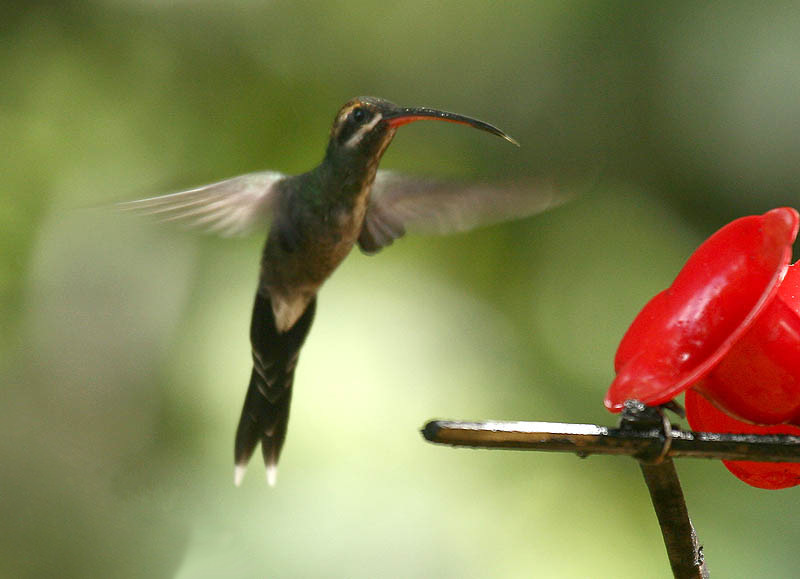

Conservation status
- Least Concern (IUCN 3.1)
- CITES Appendix II

Scientific classification
- Kingdom: Animalia
- Phylum: Chordata
- Class: Aves
- Clade: Strisores
- Order: Apodiformes
- Family: Trochilidae
- Genus: Phaethornis
- Species: P. yaruqui

Binomial name
- Phaethornis yaruqui (Bourcier, 1851)

Audio

= White-whiskered hermit =

Species of hummingbird

The white-whiskered hermit (Phaethornis yaruqui) is a species of hummingbird in the family Trochilidae. It is found in Colombia and Ecuador.

== Taxonomy and systematics ==
The white-whiskered hermit is monotypic. The western Colombia population was at one time considered to be a subspecies P. y. sanctijohannis but the description was found to be that of immature birds.

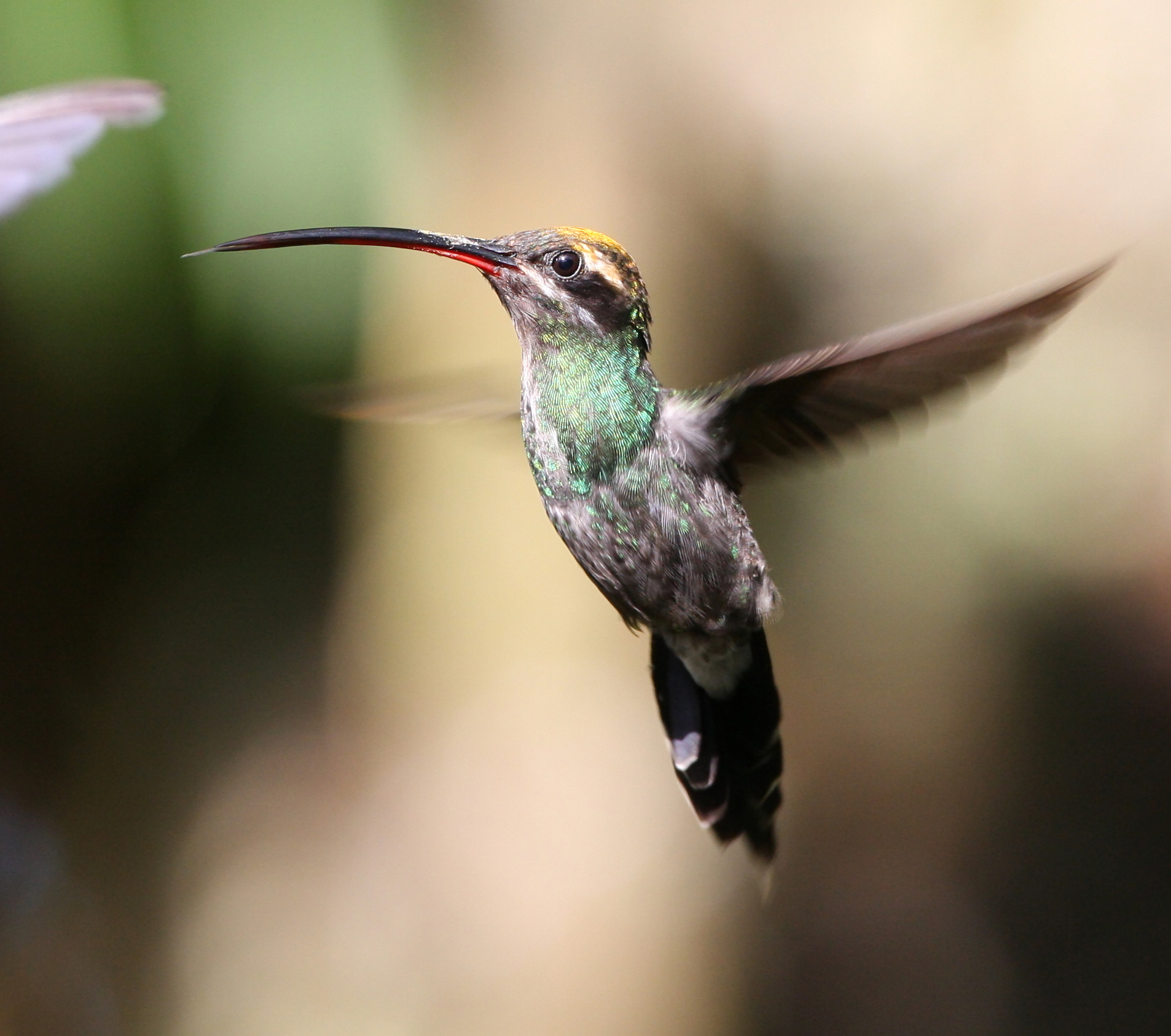
Female, Milpe Reserve, NW Ecuador

== Description ==
The white-whiskered hermit is about 13 cm (5.1 in) long. Males weigh 4 to 7 g (0.14 to 0.25 oz) and females 4 to 6.5 g (0.14 to 0.23 oz). This medium-sized hermit has a bronzy crown and iridescent bluish green upperparts. Its underparts are green to dark gray. The face has a black "mask" with a buffy supercilium and a white gular stripe. The male's bill is almost straight. The female has a shorter and gently decurved bill, shorter wings, more grayish underparts, and a longer tail than the male.

== Distribution and habitat ==
The white-whiskered hermit is found from Colombia's northern Chocó Department south through western Ecuador to El Oro Province. It has also been reported in Panama near the Colombian border. It inhabits humid mid-elevation and montane forest, humid secondary forest, dense shrublands, and plantations. In elevation it usually occurs below 1,200 m (3,900 ft) but has been recorded as high as 2,000 m (6,600 ft).

== Behavior ==
=== Movement ===
The white-whiskered hermit is primarily sedentary but apparently makes seasonal elevation movements in Ecuador.

=== Feeding ===
The white-whiskered hermit is a "trap-line" feeder like other hermit hummingbirds, visiting a circuit of a wide variety of flowering plants for nectar. It also consumes small arthropods.

=== Breeding ===
The white-whiskered hermit's breeding season has not been described, though it appears to span from November to July. The nest is a cone-shaped cup suspended from the underside of a drooping leaf. The clutch size is two eggs.

=== Vocalization ===
The white-whiskered hermit's song is "a continuous series of rather harsh 'kree-u' notes". It also gives a series of "seek" notes while wagging its tail on a low perch at a lek.

== Status ==
The IUCN has assessed the white-whiskered hermit as being of Least Concern though its population size is unknown and believed to be decreasing. It is "[g]enerally common in wet forests [but] long-term survival clearly depends on habitat conservation."
