= Semi-deciduous =

Plants that lose their foliage for a short time

Semi-deciduous or semi-evergreen is a botanical term which refers to plants that lose their foliage for a very short period, when old leaves fall off and new foliage growth is starting. This phenomenon occurs in tropical and sub-tropical woody species, for example in Dipteryx odorata. Semi-deciduous or semi-evergreen may also describe some trees, bushes or plants that normally only lose part of their foliage in autumn/winter or during the dry season, but might lose all their leaves in a manner similar to deciduous trees in an especially cold autumn/winter or severe dry season (drought).

== See also ==
- Brevideciduous
- Evergreen
- Marcescence
- Hedera
