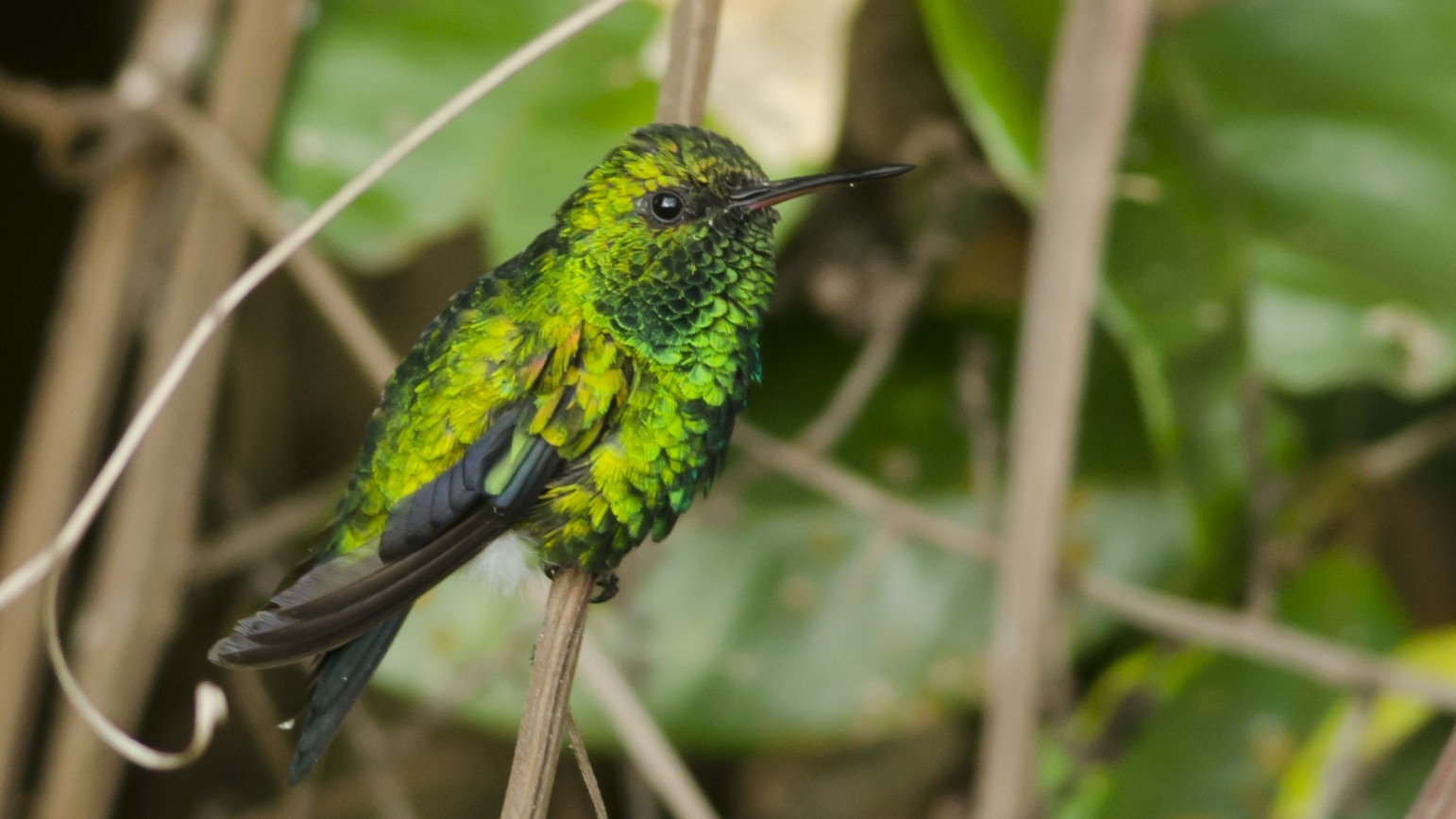
- Male
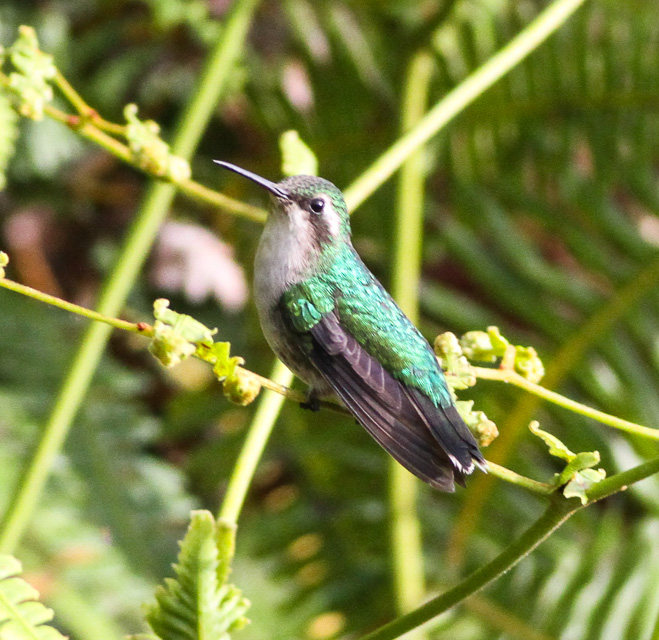
- Female

Conservation status
- Least Concern (IUCN 3.1)
- CITES Appendix II

Scientific classification
- Kingdom: Animalia
- Phylum: Chordata
- Class: Aves
- Clade: Strisores
- Order: Apodiformes
- Family: Trochilidae
- Genus: Chlorostilbon
- Species: C. gibsoni

Binomial name
- Chlorostilbon gibsoni (Fraser, 1840)
- Distribution

Synonyms
- Chlorostilbon mellisugus gibsoni

= Red-billed emerald =

Species of hummingbird

The red-billed emerald (Chlorostilbon gibsoni) is a species of hummingbird in the "emeralds", tribe Trochilini of subfamily Trochilinae. It is found in Colombia and Venezuela.

== Taxonomy and systematics ==
The red-billed emerald was originally described as a species and later treated as a subspecies of the blue-tailed emerald (Chlorostilbon mellisugus). Since the early 2000s, most taxonomist have again treated it as a species in its own right. It has also at times been considered conspecific with the western emerald (C. melanorhynchus).

As currently (2020) understood, the red-billed emerald has three subspecies: the nominate C. g. gibsoni, C. g. chrysogaster, and C. g. nitens.

== Description ==
The red-billed emerald is 7.6 to 9 cm (3.0 to 3.5 in) long and weighs about 2.8 g (0.099 oz). The males of all three subspecies have a straight bill with a mostly red mandible. The females' mandibles are red at the base. The bills are about 1.3 cm (0.51 in) long. Males of the nominate subspecies have dark bronze-green upperparts and a deeply forked blue-black tail. Their faces and underparts are glittering green to golden green. Nominate females are shining green above and plain gray below with dusky cheeks and a short white line behind the eye. Their central tail feathers are dark blue-green and the rest dark green with dusky ends and narrow gray-white tips.

Subspecies C. g. chrysogaster is larger than the other two subspecies. The male is mostly malachite green; its tail is slightly bluer and more deeply forked than the others'. C. g. nitens is very like the nominate, but with a slight gold sheen and a less deeply forked tail.

== Distribution and habitat ==
The nominate subspecies of red-billed emerald is found in central Colombia's Magdalena River valley. C. g. chrysogaster is found in northern Colombia between Córdoba and Norte de Santander departments. C. g. nitens is found on Colombia's Guajira Peninsula and adjoining northwestern Venezuela. The species mostly inhabits dry to arid landscapes including desert scrublands, dry woodland, farmed areas, and parks and gardens. In Colombia it is mostly found at elevations below 500 m (1,600 ft) but does occur as high as 2,300 m (7,500 ft) in the upper Magdalena valley. In Venezuela it has been recorded up to 1,300 m (4,300 ft).

== Behavior ==
=== Movement ===
No movements of the red-billed emerald are definitely known, but at least in parts of northern Colombia it appears to make seasonal changes.

=== Feeding ===
The red-billed emerald forages for nectar by trap-lining, visiting a circuit of flowering trees, shrubs, and other plants. It usually feeds close to the ground, though sometimes higher, and on small flowers that are less attractive to larger hummingbirds. It is assumed to also feed on small insects.

=== Breeding ===
The red-billed emerald's breeding seasons are not well defined but appear to span March to August in Venezuela and include November in at least one part of Colombia. One nest was a downy cup with lichen on its outside attached to a fern frond.

=== Vocalization ===
The red-billed emerald's song is "a continuous series of wiry trilled notes, 'wirrr...wirrr...wirrr...'". It also makes "high-pitched penetrating 'tseeee' and a reedy 'tzreee'" calls.

== Status ==
The IUCN has assessed the red-billed emerald as being of Least Concern, though its population size and trend are unknown. It is considered uncommon throughout its range, but is probably not threatened by human actions because its dry habitat is not heavily used.
