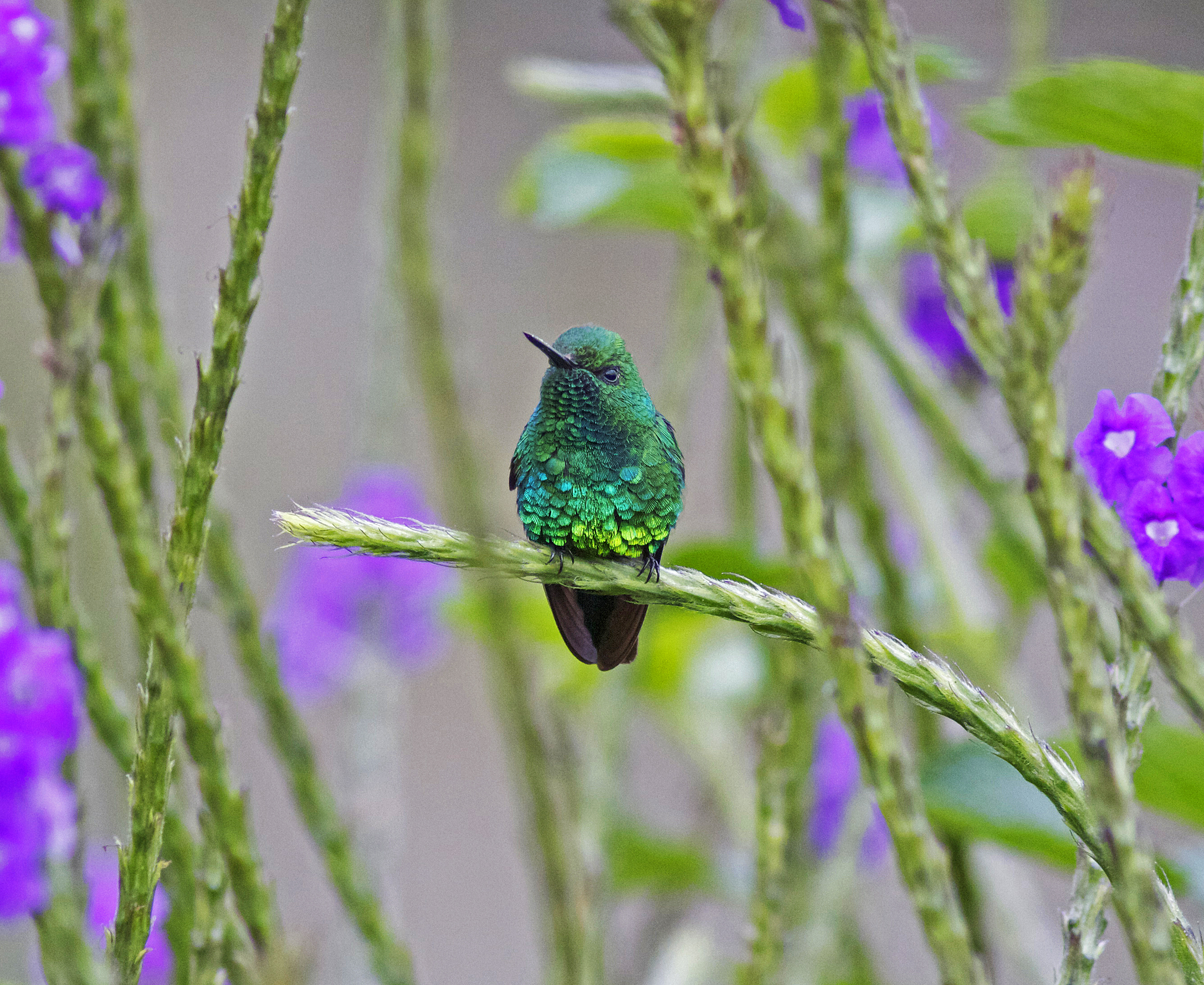
- Resting on a blue porterweed

Conservation status
- Least Concern (IUCN 3.1)
- CITES Appendix II

Scientific classification
- Kingdom: Animalia
- Phylum: Chordata
- Class: Aves
- Clade: Strisores
- Order: Apodiformes
- Family: Trochilidae
- Genus: Chlorostilbon
- Species: C. assimilis

Binomial name
- Chlorostilbon assimilis Lawrence, 1861

= Garden emerald =

Species of hummingbird

The garden emerald (Chlorostilbon assimilis) is a small hummingbird in the "emeralds", tribe Trochilini of subfamily Trochilinae. It is found in Costa Rica and Panama.

== Taxonomy and systematics ==
The garden emerald was at one time considered a subspecies of the blue-tailed emerald (Chlorostilbon mellisugus). As its own species, it is monotypic.

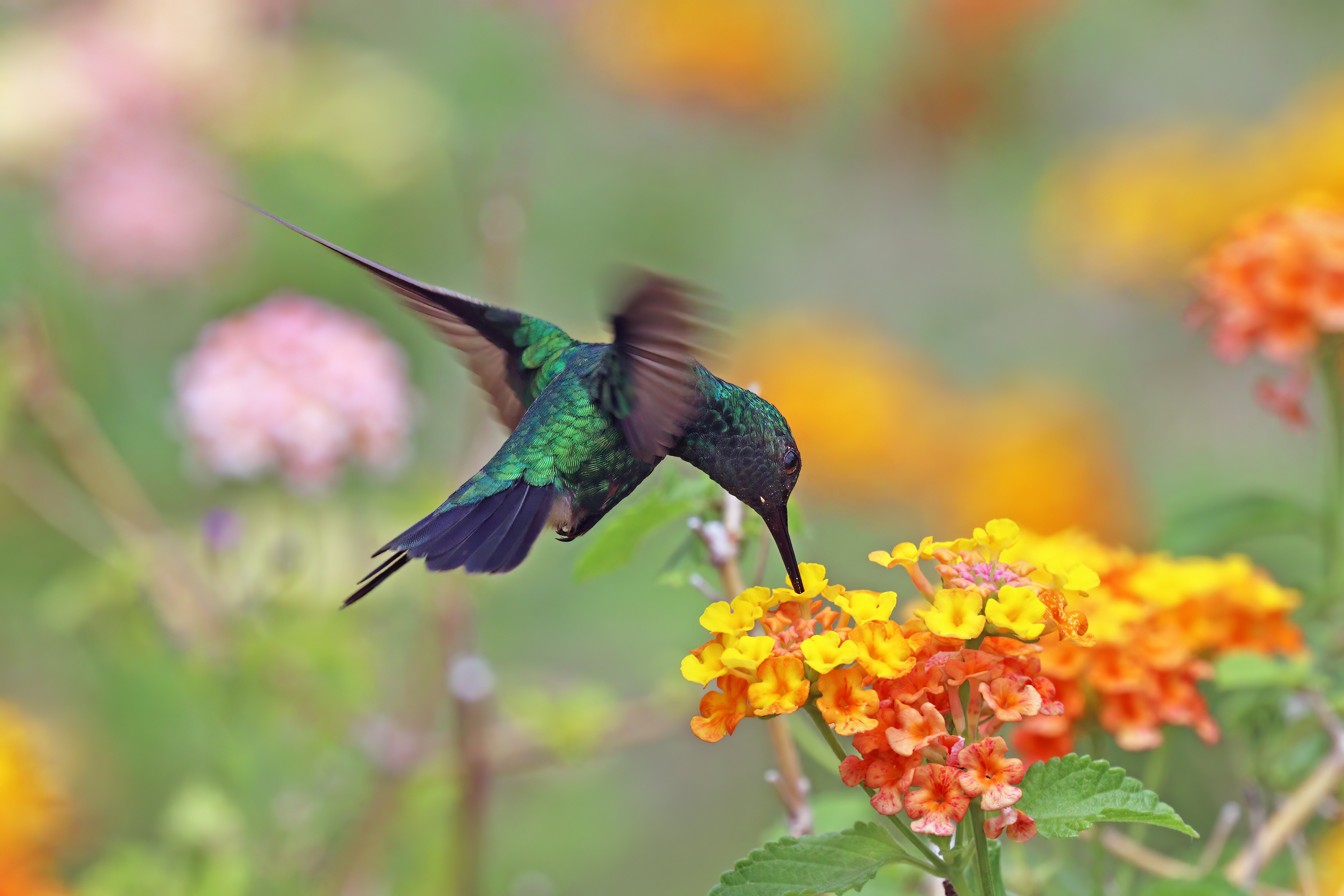
Male in flight, Panama

== Description ==
The garden emerald is 7.8 to 8.5 cm (3.1 to 3.3 in) long and weighs about 3 to 4.1 g (0.11 to 0.14 oz). The adult male has dark metallic green upperparts with bluish green uppertail coverts. Its forked tail is blue-black and the central feathers have a light bluish green gloss. Its underparts are a brighter metallic green than the upperparts, sometimes with a light blue sheen, and it has white thigh tufts. The adult female has bright metallic green to bronze green upperparts with bluish green uppertail coverts. Its tail is blue-black, with dull metallic green central feathers and pale gray tips on the outer ones. It has dusky cheeks, a white or grayish white spot behind the eye, and pale gray underparts. Juvenile males are like the adult female but darker gray below.

== Distribution and habitat ==
The garden emerald is found in southwestern Costa Rica, the Pacific coast of Panama, and the offshore Coiba and Pearl islands. It inhabits open landscapes like the edges of woodlands, hedgerows, streamside thickets, scrublands, and gardens. It is a bird of the lowlands, reaching from sea level to 1,500 m (4,900 ft) in Costa Rica and 1,200 m (3,900 ft) in Panama.

== Behavior ==
=== Movement ===
The garden emerald is generally sedentary. However, there are reports of its moving back and forth between mainland Panama, the Pearl Islands, and other small islands.

=== Feeding ===
The garden emerald forages for nectar by trap-lining, visiting a circuit of flowering trees, shrubs, and other plants. It also feeds on small insects that it gleans from vegetation.

=== Breeding ===
The garden emerald's breeding season has not been fully determined but in Panama appears to span at least from November to March. Its nest, incubation length, time to fledging, and other details of its breeding phenology have not been documented. They are assumed to be similar to those of other Chlorostilbon hummingbirds.

=== Vocalization ===
The garden emerald's vocalizations are not well known but appear to be similar to those of Canivet's emerald (Cynanthus canivetii). That species' song is believed to be "an endlessly repeated, characterless wiry tseee tseeree" and its call has been described as "a dry, scratchy chut or chit, sometimes run together into a soft, staccato chatter".

== Status ==
The IUCN has assessed the garden emerald as being of Least Concern. It has a large range and its estimated population of at least 50,000 mature individuals is believed to be stable. No immediate threats have been identified. It "[r]eadily accepts man-made habitat" and may even have expanded its range as forest has been cleared.
