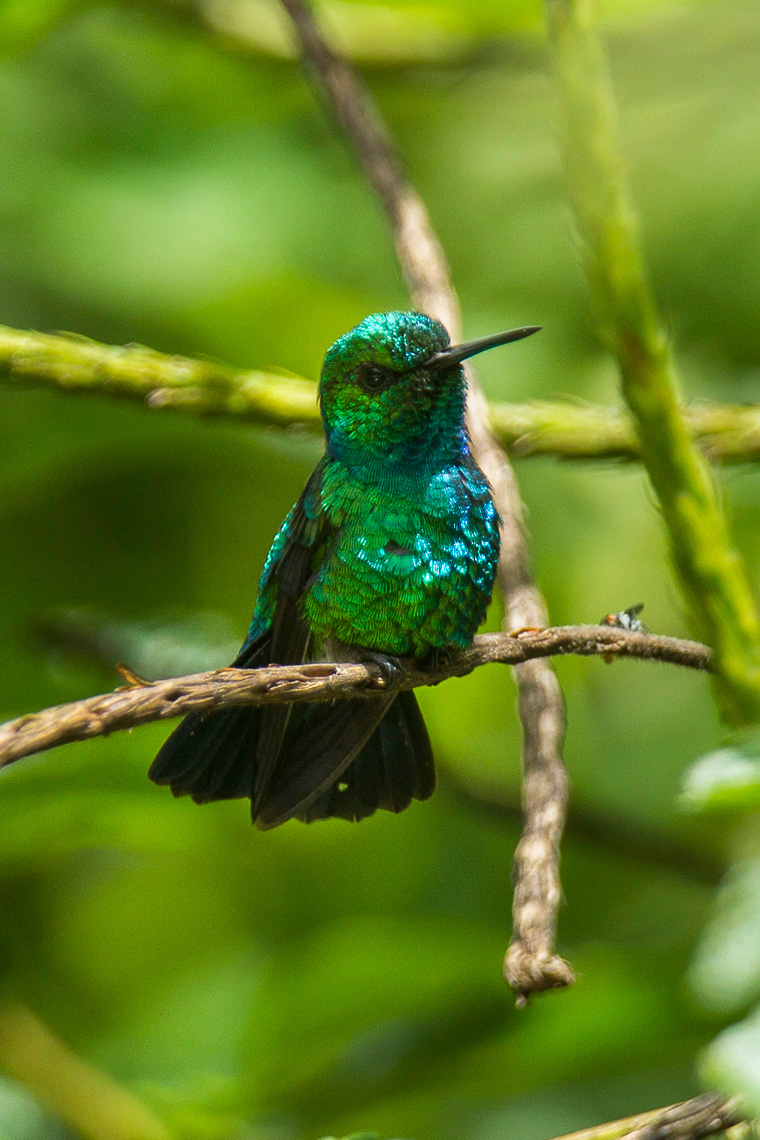

Conservation status
- Least Concern (IUCN 3.1)
- CITES Appendix II

Scientific classification
- Kingdom: Animalia
- Phylum: Chordata
- Class: Aves
- Clade: Strisores
- Order: Apodiformes
- Family: Trochilidae
- Genus: Chlorostilbon
- Species: C. mellisugus

Binomial name
- Chlorostilbon mellisugus (Linnaeus, 1758)

Synonyms
- Trochilus mellisugus Linnaeus, 1758; Ornismya prasina Lesson, 1830; Chlorostilbon brevicaudatus Gould, 1861

= Blue-tailed emerald =

Species of hummingbird

The blue-tailed emerald (Chlorostilbon mellisugus) is a hummingbird in the "emeralds", tribe Trochilini of subfamily Trochilinae. It is found in tropical and subtropical South America east of the Andes from Colombia east to the Guianas and Trinidad, and south to northern Bolivia and central Brazil.

== Taxonomy and systematics ==
The blue-tailed emerald was formally described by the Swedish naturalist Carl Linnaeus in 1758 in the tenth edition of his Systema Naturae under the binomial name Trochilus mellisugus. The specific epithet combines the Latin mel meaning "honey" and sugere meaning "to suck". Linnaeus's description was typically brief and it was unclear which species he was describing. When he updated his Systema Naturae for the twelfth edition in 1766 Linnaeus added citations including one to the "all-green humming-bird" that had been described and illustrated by the English naturalist George Edwards in his Gleanings of Natural History. The identity still remained uncertain but in 1950 the American ornithologist John T. Zimmer argued that the species Trochilus mellisugus described by Linnaeus could only have been the blue-tailed emerald. This has been generally accepted. Zimmer designated the type locality as Cayenne in French Guiana. The blue-tailed emerald is now placed in the genus Chlorostilbon that was introduced by the English ornithologist John Gould in 1853.

The blue-tailed emerald has at times had as many as 17 subspecies assigned to it. Most of them have been reevaluated as individual species, as subspecies of other species, or as not being distinguishable at all.

Three major worldwide taxonomic systems differ in their treatment of the species. The International Ornithological Committee (IOC) recognizes seven subspecies. The Clements taxonomy recognizes six and BirdLife International's Handbook of the Birds of the World (HBW) recognizes eight.

Seven subspecies recognised by the IOC are:

- C. m. caribaeus Lawrence, 1871
- C. m. duidae Zimmer, JT & Phelps, 1952
- C. m. subfurcatus Berlepsch, 1887
- C. m. mellisugus (Linnaeus, 1758)
- C. m. phoeopygus (Tschudi, 1844
- C. m. napensis Gould, 1861
- C. m. peruanus Gould, 1861

The Clements taxonomy and HBW include napensis within phoeopygus, considering them indistinguishable from each other. However, HBW's subspecies include C. m. pumilis and C. m. melanorhynchus. Clements assigns those two subspecies to the western emerald (C. melanorhynchus), which the IOC also recognizes. However, the IOC does not recognize pumilis and treats the western emerald as monotypic.

Molecular phylogenetic studies suggest that the blue-tailed emerald is sister to the glittering-bellied emerald. However, the IOC, Clements, and HBW do not appear to have fully accepted that treatment, as their linear sequences of species (which reflect relationships) insert the Chiribiquete emerald (C. olivaresi) between the two.

== Description ==
Male blue-tailed emeralds are 7.5 to 9.5 cm (3.0 to 3.7 in) long and females 6.5 to 7.5 cm (2.6 to 3.0 in). Males of C. m. caribaeus average about 2.7 g (0.095 oz) and females about 2.5 g (0.088 oz). Males of C. m. phoeopygus average about 2.7 g (0.095 oz) and females about 2.4 g (0.085 oz). Both sexes of all subspecies have a short, straight, black bill. All of the males have a forked tail whose depth varies somewhat among the subspecies. Females are essentially indistinguisable from each other.

Males of the nominate subspecies have an iridescent golden green forehead and crown, shining bronze-green upperparts, and a steel blue tail. Their underparts are glittering emerald green that is most iridescent on the breast and bluish on the throat. They have white thighs. The nominate female's forehead and crown are bronzy green. Its face has a blackish "mask" with a pale gray stripe behind the eye. The rest of its upperparts are metallic grass green and the tail blue-black with whitish gray tips. Its underparts are pale gray.

Subspecies C. m. caribaeus is very like the nominate but the male has less blue on its throat. Male C. m. duidaes have a bronzy orange head and reddish copper upperparts. Males of C. m. subfurcatus have blue-green on the throat and uppertail coverts and golden green on the crown whose intensities are intermediate between the nominate and caribaeus. C. m. phoeopygus has a deeper fork to the tail than the nominate. C. m. peruanus looks essentially the same as the nominate.

== Distribution and habitat ==
The seven subspecies of blue-tailed emerald recognized by the IOC are distributed thus:

- C. m. caribaeus, northern Venezuela, Trinidad, and the "ABC Islands"
- C. m. duidae, Cerro Duida region of southern Venezuela's Amazonas state
- C. m. subfurcatus, eastern and southern Venezuela, Guyana, and the Rio Branco region of northwestern Brazil
- C. m. mellisugus, Suriname, French Guiana, and the lower Amazon basin of northeastern Brazil
- C. m. phoeopygus, the upper Amazon River and its eastern tributaries in Colombia, Ecuador, and Brazil
- C. m. napensis, the upper Amazon River in northeastern Peru
- C. m. peruanus, southeastern Peru, eastern Bolivia, and possibly extreme southwestern Brazil

The species occurs in a variety of habitats from the tropical to the temperate zones. It mostly is found in semi-open to open landscapes such as savanna, cerrado, cultivated areas, and gardens. It also occurs in the edges of deciduous woodland and in large clearings within terra firme forest, and commonly in Ecuador, Várzea and floodplain forest. In elevation it ranges between 750 and 2,600 m (2,500 and 8,500 ft) in Ecuador, up to 1,200 m (3,900 ft) in Peru, and from sea level to about 1,850 m (6,100 ft) in Venezuela.

== Behavior ==
=== Movement ===
The blue-tailed emerald is mostly sedentary but in some areas apparently makes seasonal movements.

=== Feeding ===
The blue-tailed emerald forages for nectar mostly by trap-lining, visiting a circuit of flowering plants. However, in some areas it defends patches of flowers. It takes nectar from a very wide variety of low plants, shubs, and trees, and feeds at all levels of the vegetation. In addition to nectar, it captures small insects and other arthropods by hawking from a perch.

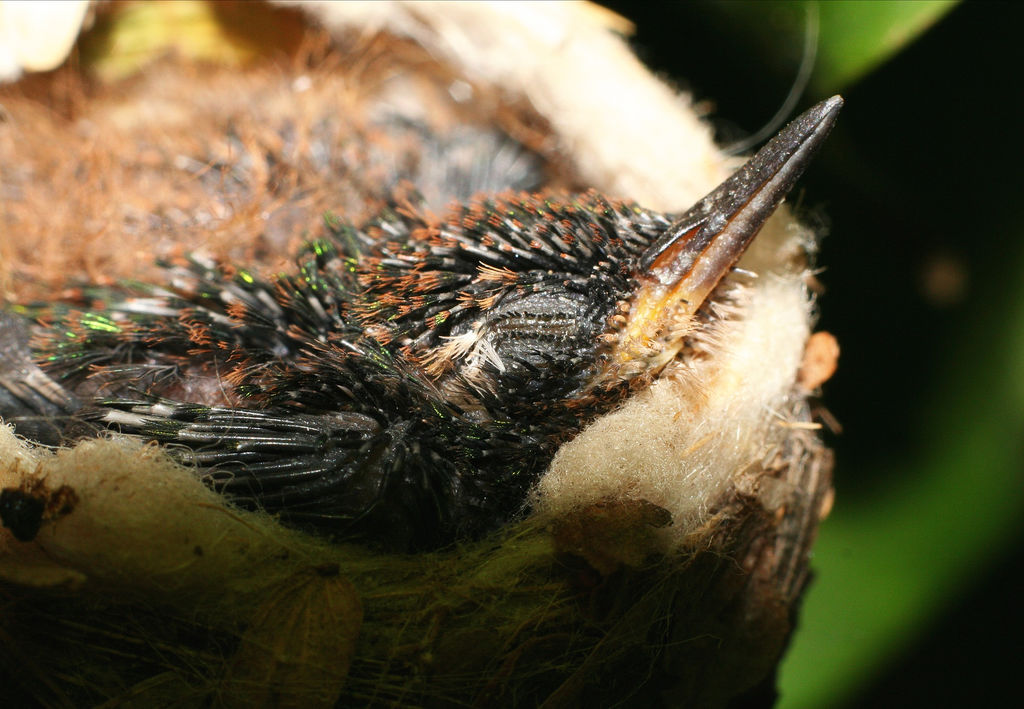
A one-week-old blue-tailed emerald in its nest

=== Breeding ===
The blue-tailed emerald's northernmost subspecies C. m. caribaeus appears to nest at any time of year. The other subspecies' breeding seasons have not been documented. The species makes a cup nest of downy plant material bound with spiderweb and covered with bits of bark and lichen. It tends to place it on a sloping branch within about 1 m (3 ft) of the ground in dense second-growth vegetation. The female incubates the clutch of two eggs for 13 to 19 days and fledging occurs 18 to 20 days after hatch.

=== Vocalization ===
The blue-tailed emerald's song has been described as "repeated 'tsip' or chwep notes, with occasional rolls or twitters". Its calls include "a relatively loud and harsh chirrrt and "soft 'tsip', 'pit' and 'chwep'" notes.

== Status ==
The IUCN follows HBW taxonomy and so includes what IOC and Clements calls the western emerald. It has assessed the blue-tailed emerald as being of Least Concern. It has a very large range, and though its population size is not known it is believed to be stable. It is considered common across much of its range though less so on Trinidad and eastern Ecuador. It occurs in several protected areas and has adapted to human-made landscapes.
