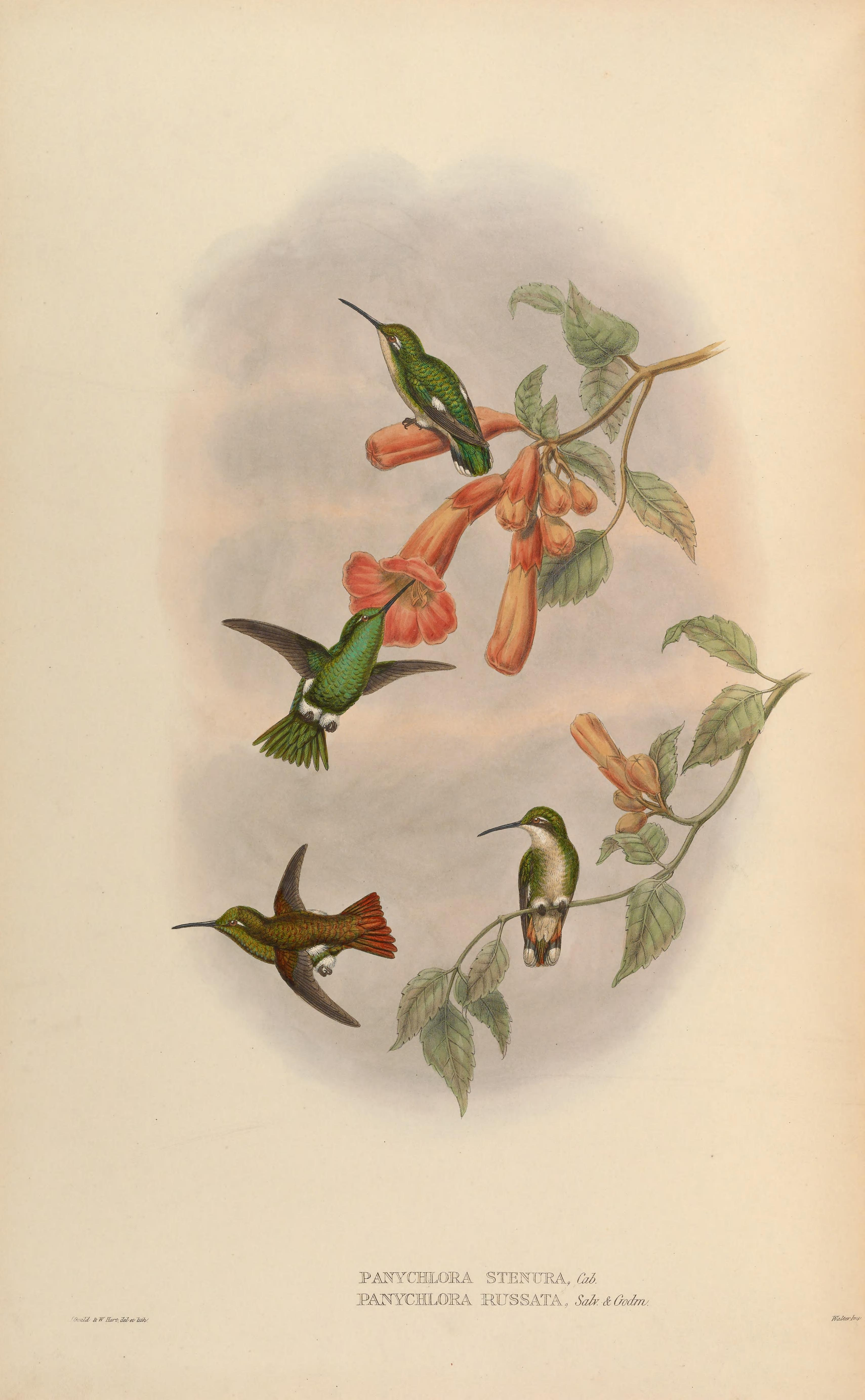
- Coppery emerald (bottom) with narrow-tailed emerald (top)

Conservation status
- Least Concern (IUCN 3.1)
- CITES Appendix II (CITES)

Scientific classification
- Kingdom: Animalia
- Phylum: Chordata
- Class: Aves
- Clade: Strisores
- Order: Apodiformes
- Family: Trochilidae
- Genus: Chlorostilbon
- Species: C. russatus

Binomial name
- Chlorostilbon russatus (Salvin & Godman, 1881)

= Coppery emerald =

Species of hummingbird

The coppery emerald (Chlorostilbon russatus) is a species of hummingbird in the "emeralds", tribe Trochilini of subfamily Trochilinae. It is found in Colombia and Venezuela.

== Taxonomy and systematics ==
The coppery emerald is monotypic.

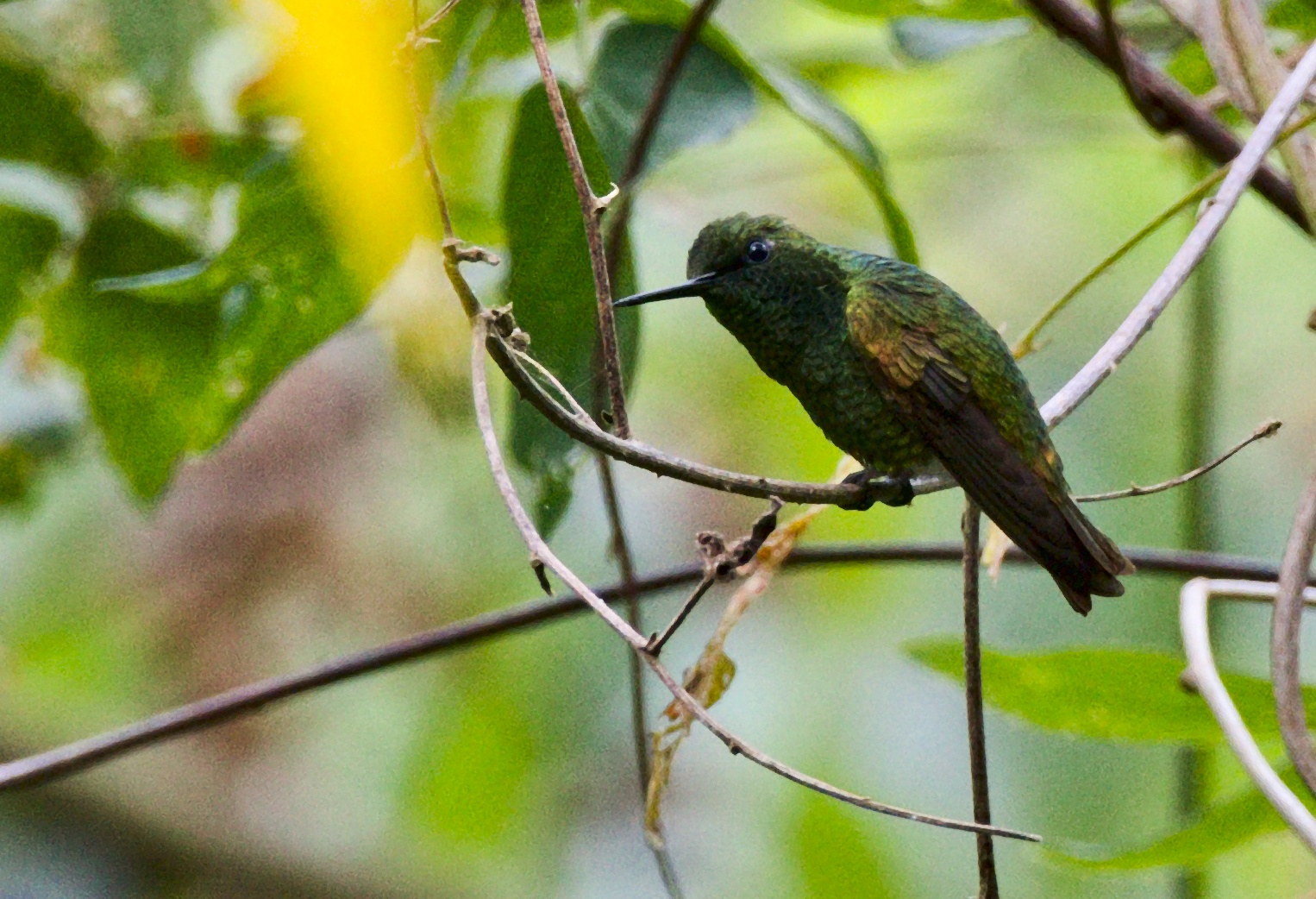
Male coppery emerald

== Description ==
The male coppery emerald is 8 to 8.5 cm (3.1 to 3.3 in) long and females 7 to 7.5 cm (2.8 to 3.0 in). The species weighs between 3.2 and 3.6 g (0.11 and 0.13 oz). Both sexes have a short, straight, black bill. The male's forehead, crown, and upperparts are shining golden green. Its uppertail coverts are coppery green, and its slightly forked tail is golden coppery. Its underparts are glittering golden green. The female's forehead, crown, upperparts, flanks, and uppertail coverts are coppery green and its underparts are smoky gray. Its tail is also slightly forked; its feathers are greenish coppery and the outer four pairs of feathers have a coppery purple band near the end and pale tips. Immature coppery emeralds are similar to adult females with buffy fringes on the feathers of the head.

== Distribution and habitat ==
The coppery emerald is found in Colombia's lower Magdalena River valley and Santa Marta department (including the Sierra Nevada de Santa Marta) and also Serranía del Perijá that straddles the northern Colombia/western Venezuela border. It inhabits semi-open and open landscapes such as scrublands, forest edges, and cultivated areas. The coppery emerald's elevation (flight height) ranges from sea-level to 2,600 m (8,500 ft). It is usually between 500 and 1,700 m (1,600 and 5,600 ft).

== Behavior ==
=== Movement ===
The coppery emerald is generally sedentary. It may vary its height (elevation) to adapt to the season.

=== Feeding ===
The coppery emerald forages for nectar by trap-lining, visiting a circuit of a variety of flowering plants, especially Leguminaceae, Rubiaceae, Heliconiaceae, and Gesneriaceae. It generally forages between 4 and 12 m (13 and 39 ft) above the ground. It captures small insects by hawking from a perch and sometimes by gleaning from vegetation.

=== Breeding ===
The coppery emerald breeds in May and June. It makes a cup nest lined with downy plant material, typically on a sloping branch about 0.8 m (3 ft) above the ground. The female incubates the clutch of two eggs for 15 to 16 days and fledging occurs about 20 days after hatch.

=== Vocalization ===
The coppery emerald makes "a repeated short 'tsik' or 'trk'" while feeding.

== Status ==
The IUCN has assessed the coppery emerald as being of Least Concern, though it has a limited range and its population size and trend are unknown. No immediate threats have been identified. It is patchily distributed and considered uncommon to locally common. It readily uses human-made landscapes like plantations and parks.
