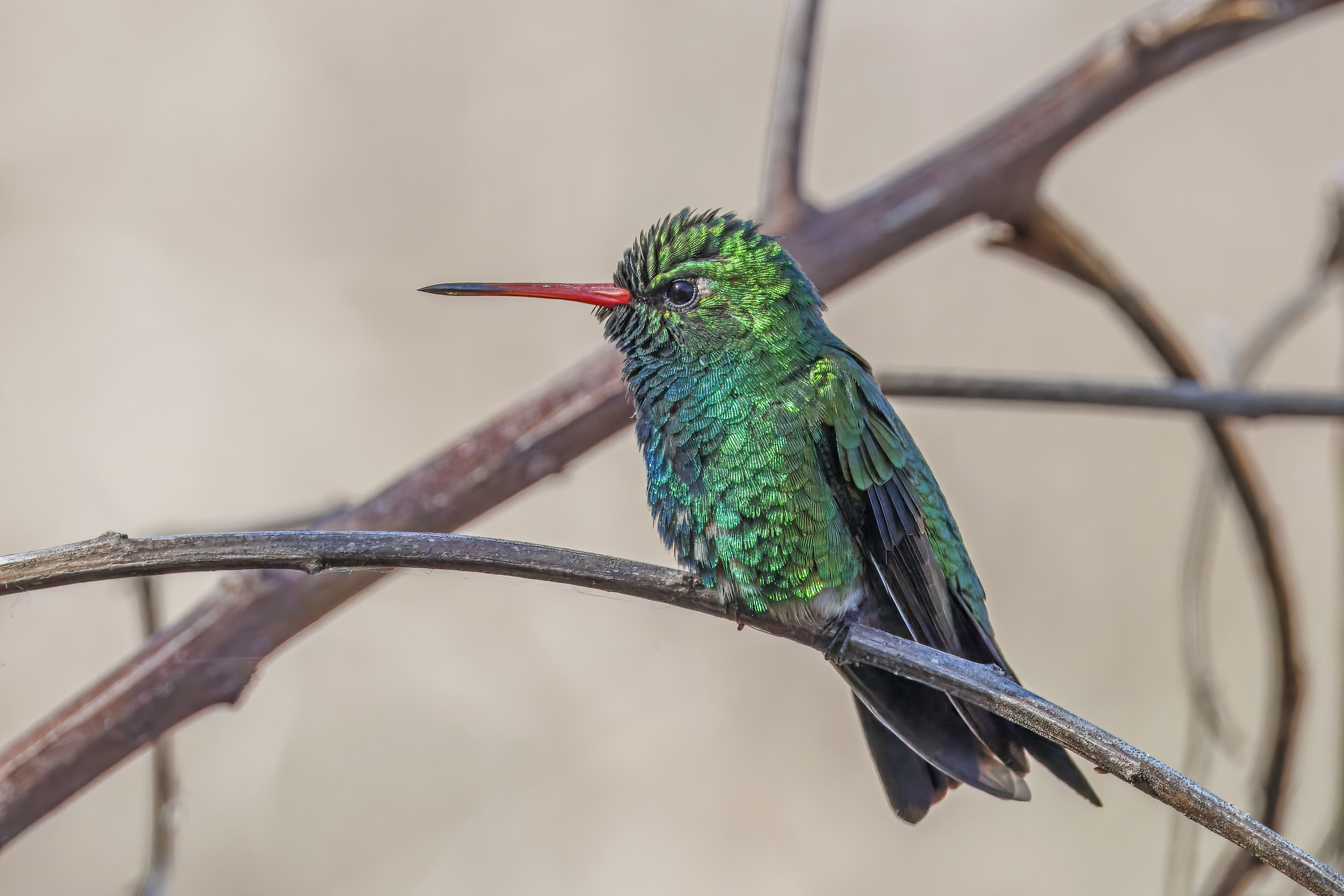
- Male

Conservation status
- Least Concern (IUCN 3.1)
- CITES Appendix II

Scientific classification
- Kingdom: Animalia
- Phylum: Chordata
- Class: Aves
- Order: Apodiformes
- Family: Trochilidae
- Genus: Chlorostilbon
- Species: C. lucidus

Binomial name
- Chlorostilbon lucidus (Shaw, 1812)

Synonyms
- Chlorostilbon aureoventris (D'Orbigny and Lafresnaye, 1838)

= Glittering-bellied emerald =

Species of hummingbird

The glittering-bellied emerald (Chlorostilbon lucidus) is a species of hummingbird in the "emeralds", tribe Trochilini of subfamily Trochilinae. It is found in Argentina, Bolivia, Brazil, Paraguay, and Uruguay.

== Taxonomy and systematics ==
The glittering-bellied emerald was widely called by the scientific name Chlorostilbon aureoventris, but in 2006 José Pacheco and Bret Whitney showed that lucidus is the correct specific epithet due to the principle of priority.

The International Ornithological Committee (IOC) assigns three subspecies to the glittering-bellied emerald: the nominate C. l. lucidus, C. l. pucherani, and C. l. beflepschi. The Clements taxonomy and BirdLife International's Handbook of the Birds of the World add C. l. igneous, whose population the IOC includes in the nominate. Some ornithologists believe that pucherani is "approaching the species threshold".

The authorities and distributions for the three subspecies are:

- C. l. pucherani (Bourcier & Mulsant, 1848) – east Brazil
- C. l. lucidus (Shaw, 1812) – Bolivia, Paraguay, central west Brazil and northwest Argentina
- C. l. berlepschi Pinto, 1938 – south Brazil, Uruguay and northeast Argentina

The subspecies C. l. pucherani is the type species of the genus Chlorostilbon.

== Description ==
The male glittering-bellied emerald is 9.5 to 10.5 cm (3.7 to 4.1 in) long and weighs 3 to 3.8 g (0.11 to 0.13 oz). Females are 7.5 to 8.5 cm (3.0 to 3.3 in) long and weigh 3 to 4.5 g (0.11 to 0.16 oz). Both sexes have a short straight bill. The male's is red with a black tip; the female's is black on its outer half and red on the inner.

Males of the nominate subspecies have a dull bronzy green forehead and crown, slightly golden green upperparts, grass green uppertail coverts, and a slightly forked dark steely blue tail. It has a blue-green throat and upper breast and a bronze to bronzy green belly that is more iridescent than the upperparts. The nominate female's forehead, crown, and upperparts are slightly golden green and its uppertail coverts grass green. The innermost pair of tail feathers have green inner and blue outer halves. The other four pairs are steel blue with gray tips in a V shape. It has a grayish white streak behind the eye and a whitish throat that darkens to pale brownish gray on the breast and belly.

Subspecies C. l. beflepschi has pure green rather than golden green upperparts. C. l. pucherani has the same plumage as the nominate but is slightly smaller. When considered separately, C. l. igneous has many glittering orange-gold speckles on its belly.

The song is "a high-pitched, cricket-like trill...repeated at intervals." Its principal call, given when feeding or hovering, is "a short dry, scratchy rattle, 'trrrr' or 'krrr'." It also makes "a fast descending series of 'tsee-tsee-tsee-tsu-tsew-tsew-tsew' notes" during agonistic encounters.

== Distribution and habitat ==
Subspecies C. l. pucherani of glittering-bellied emerald is found in eastern Brazil from Maranhão and Ceará all the way south to Paraná. The nominate C. l. lucidus is found in eastern Bolivia, Paraguay, and southwestern Brazil including Mato Grosso. C. l. igneous, when treated separately from the nominate, is found in western and northern Argentina. C. l. beflepschi is found from Rio Grande do Sul in southeastern Brazil through Uruguay into northeastern Argentina to Buenos Aires Province. The species has also been recorded as a vagrant in Chile and Peru.

The glittering-bellied emerald inhabits a variety of semi-arid to somewhat humid, open to semi-open landscapes. It occurs in scrublands, savanna, grasslands, the edges of forest, and in parks and gardens. In elevation it ranges from sea level to 3,500 m (11,500 ft) but is most common between 500 and 3,500 m (1,600 and 11,500 ft). It is sedentary, but vagrancy has been documented.

== Behavior ==
=== Feeding ===
The glittering-bellied emerald forages for nectar by trap-lining, visiting a circuit of a wide variety of flowering plants. In addition to taking nectar from the flower opening, it pierces the bases of some kinds to obtain it. It generally forages between 4 and 12 m (13 and 39 ft) above the ground. It captures small insects by hawking from a perch and has been observed taking insect honeydew.

=== Breeding ===
The glittering-bellied emerald's breeding season spans at least from August to February. It makes a cup nest of fine plant fibers and bark strips held together by spiderweb, lined with softer material, and covered on the outside with lichen and other camouflage. It typically places it on a thin branch in a small tree but nests have also been found attached to exposed roots about 1 m (3 ft) above the ground. The female incubates the clutch of two eggs for about 14 days and fledging occurs 20 to 22 days after hatch.

== Status ==
The IUCN has assessed the glittering-bellied emerald as being of Least Concern. It has a very large range but its population size and trend are not known. No specific threats have been identified. It is considered common throughout its range and is the most often seen hummingbird in its part of Argentina. It occurs in several protected areas and is accustomed to gardens, parks, and plantations.
