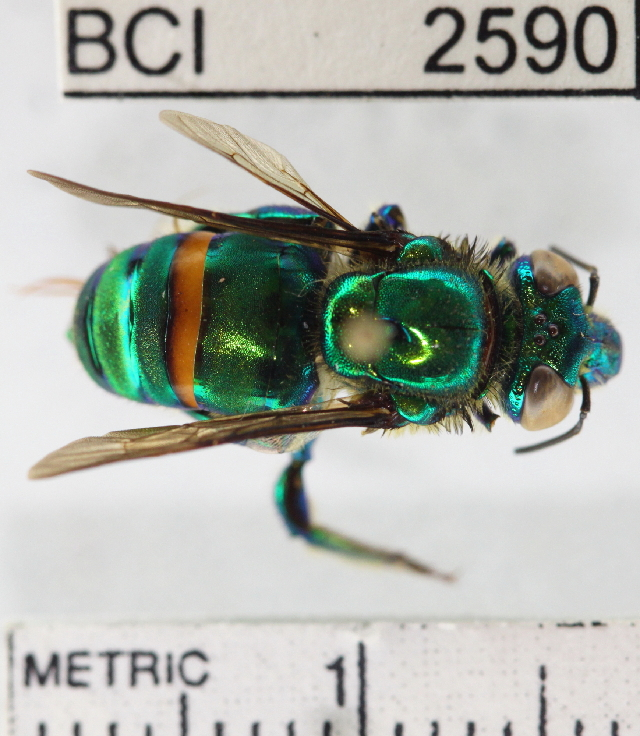

Scientific classification
- Kingdom: Animalia
- Phylum: Arthropoda
- Clade: Pancrustacea
- Class: Insecta
- Order: Hymenoptera
- Family: Apidae
- Genus: Euglossa
- Species: E. imperialis

Binomial name
- Euglossa imperialis (Cockerell, 1922)

= Euglossa imperialis =

Species of bee

Euglossa imperialis is a bee species in the family Apidae. It is considered to be one of the most important pollinators to many Neotropical orchid species in mainland tropical America. It is also one of the most common non-parasitic euglossine species in lowland Panama. E. imperialis, unlike many other bee species, is not a social bee in the sense that there is no apparent morphological or physiological division within the species to distinguish individual bees to be part of a worker or reproductive caste.

== Taxonomy and phylogenetics ==
Euglossa imperialis is a bee species of the Euglossini tribe and Apidae family. The Euglossini are better known as "orchid bees," as they are known to interact almost exclusively with flowering orchid species as pollinators, and are known to search for nectar and chemical fragrances as well. The Euglossini tribe consists of approximately 240 species grouped into five genera—Euglossa, Eufriesea, Eulaema, Exaerete, and Aglae— all of which are spread from northern Mexico to northern Argentina. These euglossine bees comprise up to around 25% of local bee communities in lowland wet forests in this region. The Euglossini tribe is also part of the larger Apinae sub-family, which contains many of the known advanced social bees, such as the honey bees, stingless bees, and bumblebees; however, bees of the Euglossini tribe are non-social in nature, meaning that they have not developed a colonial structure with Queen-drone interactions.

=== Phylogenetic community assembly ===
Temporal variation in the structure of euglossine bee communities reveal the relative contributions of varying ecological processes to the shaping of insect communities which include resource competition and habitat filtering. Specifically, phylogenetic diversity changes across latitudinal gradients, in which the more seasonal climates have decreased phylogenetic diversity. It has therefore been theorized that the same ecological processes that drive phylogenetic diversity geographically, also shape communities at the temporal level within a given community.

== Description and identification ==
Euglossa imperialis can be identified from other bees by its relatively large size and relatively sparse hairs, which expose their brightly metallic color. Males have conspicuous white marks around the mouth, whereas similar markings are diminutive in females. Males also have a broad hind tibia, rhomboid or triangular in shape and rounded distally, used as a storage organ for aromatic materials. Male forelegs have five tarsal segments, which have dense tufts of hairs (or ‘brushes’) on the ventral surface, that are useful for picking up oily liquids by capillarity. An elongated pit covered by long hairs (a ‘scar’) can also be seen on the outer rear surface of the tibia, which shows two lobes, each of which has an opening into the tibial organ. The wall of the tibial organ is extremely wrinkled, on which the inner surface has many large branched hairs. Males also display a characteristic pattern of short, dense hairs on the outer surface of the mid tibia, with one or two small hairy patches within a much larger patch. All E. imperialis are known to have relatively long tongues in comparison to other bee species. They also have two widely separated tufts of hair without any obvious tubes or slits on the second (metasomal) sternum.

== Distribution and habitat ==
Limited to mainland Tropical America, E. imperialis range from northern Mexico to Paraguay and Argentina.

Male territories occur in light gaps in the forest, including treefalls and trails, and are almost nonexistent in areas of uninterrupted forest. Approximately half of these territories are solitary, of which males tend to be attracted to treefalls which have more potential territory sites. Each territory usually consists of a perch on the trunk of a tree about 0.5 to 1.5 m above the ground, on which the male is displayed, and a route which the male "patrols" to and from the perch. Perches are normally located on tree trunks located on the edge of treefalls. Patrol routes normally extend out into the whole open treefall space. However, it has been noted that territories do not contain flowering plants, sources from which to collect aromatic material (such as tree wounds), nest sites, or nest-building materials. Males also had a preference for use straight, smooth-barked trees about 5 to 10 cm in diameter, with an unobstructed view from the perch site. Studies have also shown that perches for E. imperialis were almost always in the shade receiving between 27.8 and 92.9 lux on sunny days and 14.8 to 46.4 lux on overcast days.

== Nest ==
Euglossa imperialis construct their nests with cells clumped in a single cluster, like bumble bee (Bombus) nests, such that it forms a globular structure rather than a comb structure. The nest chamber is approximately spherical in shape with a diameter of 13 cm. The walls are lined with a dark resinous substance thick on the floor and thin at the ceiling. The oldest cells form the bottom layer of the nest, with new cells added on top of each layer. The larvae typically occupy the older cells with eggs in the newer cells. The inner walls of the cells are smooth, whereas the exterior is rough.

Since E. imperialis is not a social bee and lacks a worker cast, the nest is constructed communally. A nest for E. imperialis, is thus the product of a combined effort of many generations of "selfish" individual behavior, indicating that rather than having a Queen dictate the construction and maintenance of the nest, each individual bee contributes to the well-being of a communal nest because it benefits each individual bee's chance of survival to propagate its genes to future generations of progeny.

== Life cycle ==
Euglossa imperialis, like many other insect species, undergoes biological change throughout its lifetime via Holometabolism, the four stages of complete metamorphosis:

=== Eggs ===
Duration of approximately 3 days in cell, eggs of E. imperialis are curved in shape and approximately 5mm long and 1mm in diameter positioned with only its anterior and posterior ends resting on the surface of the provisions.

=== Larvae ===
Duration of approximately 25 days in cell, mature larvae are ivory-colored and robust with intersegmental lines clearly defined laterally, dorsally, and ventrally.

=== Pupa ===
Duration of approximately 35 days in cell, including ‘Pre-Pupa’ stage.

=== Adult ===
Males have been observed to live about six weeks to three months, whereas females have been observed to live about three to six months.

== Colony cycle ==
Since E. imperialis is a euglossine species, they are a non-social bee, and therefore lack the formation of colonies. Studies have shown that significant barriers to establish stable perennial colonies arise from two main factors: high diploid male production and genetic polymorphism. There could be no supply of truly altruistic workers (or drones), since the supply would be inconsistent, with up to 50% of the intended diploid females actually being males. Therefore, with no drone class, colonies would not be able to adequately form. Another reason why there is such a high diploid male population is because diploid male larva live within thick, closed off resinous cells which are not readily eliminated by the females. Diploid males are therefore seen as a ‘waste’ in energy and resources, and have no adaptive value to other bees.

For the second main factor, genetic polymorphism, it is theorized that Euglossini bees have not reached a point where the threshold of genetic homogeneity permitting colony fitness has crossed the expected individual fitness. Therefore, euglossine genetic polymorphism levels appear to be higher than those of ordinary solitary bees, and much higher than social bees, since low polymorphism levels is seen as a foundation for advanced social evolution.

== Diet ==
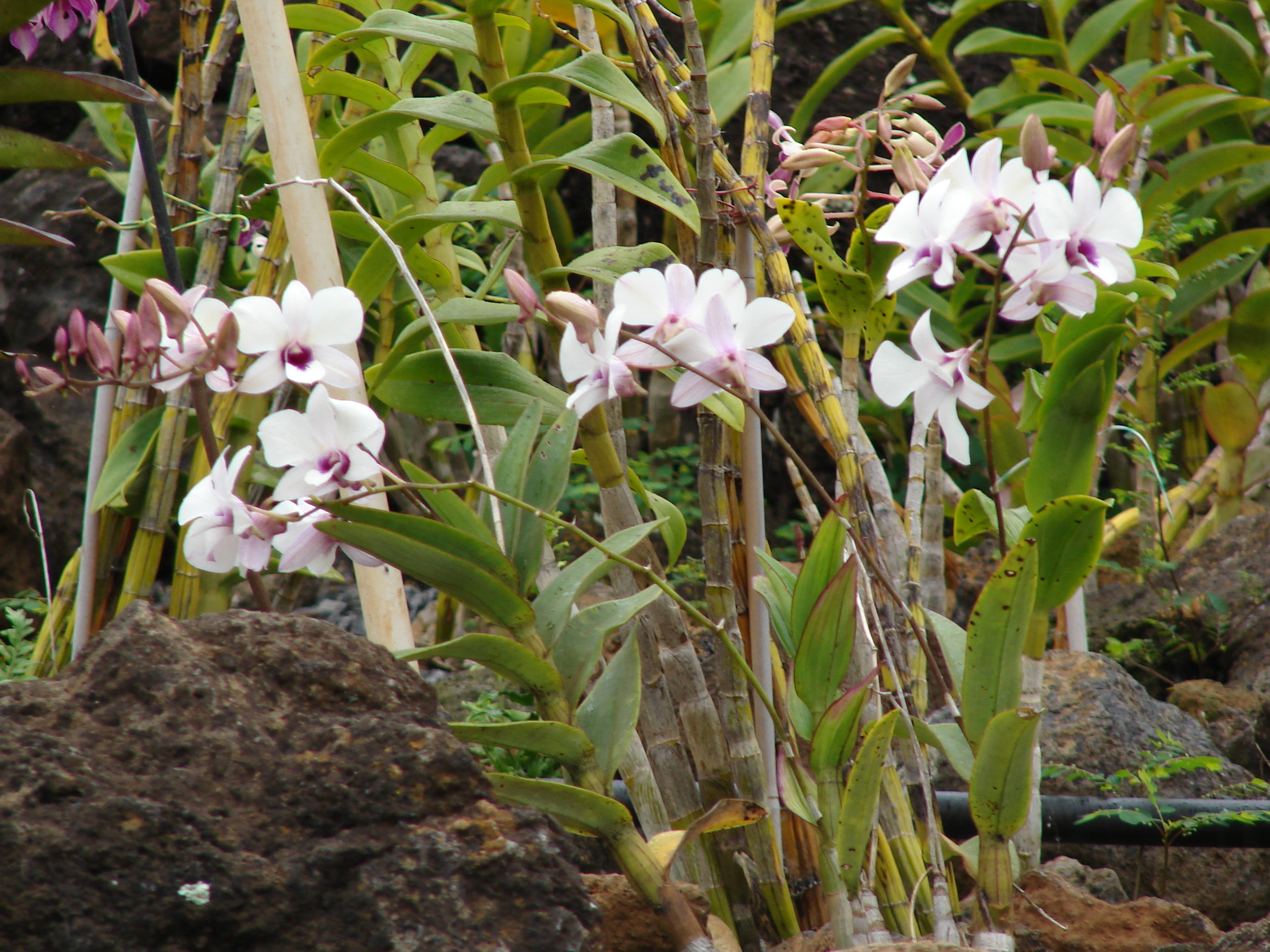
Orchidaceae

Euglossa imperialis typically feed on nectar from flowering plants, particularly of the orchid species. Studies have shown that the nectar intake rate for E. imperialis is determined primarily by nectar viscosity rather than nectar sweetness, as measured by sucrose concentrations. E. imperialis also visits a wide variety of deep flowering plants, unreachable to most other bee species, such as Bignoniaceae, Costaceae, and Marantaceae, as well as understorey herbs such as Costus laevis and Costus allenii, which are entirely dependent on female E. imperialis for pollination and cross-fertilization. Male euglossines have also been observed to collect chemical fragrances from floral sources—such as Orchidaceae, Solanaceae, Bignoniaceae, and Euphorbiaceae—as well as non-floral sources, including decaying wood, rotting fruit, animal feces, and tree wounds.

== Behavior ==
=== Food foraging ===
Euglossa imperialis are relatively site-constant when it comes to foraging, meaning that they regularly return to the same areas to forage for nectar, reminiscent of traplines. These are specific foraging routes individual bees utilize to visit the same flowering individuals in a daily regular sequence. These traplines reduce the time bees have to spend searching for food each day; each bee has a set circuit and begins foraging from the same plant on consecutive days. E. imperialis forage efficiently in this way by flying rapidly from one precise flowering plant to the next in its daily sequence, even ignoring newly blooming plants adjacent, but outside of, its regular route. Severe shortages of food may also cause males to migrate or change their foraging behavior to become transient and vagabond, in which males will fly longer distances to find food. This behavior can also be expected to change with the changing seasons, as certain plants flower in different seasons.

=== Nectar feeding behavior ===
Contrary to most other bee species which have a short proboscis to consume nectar with a lapping motion of their hair-covered tongues, the long-tongued Euglossini bees utilize a purely suction feeding method to ingest nectar from deep flowers, such as flowering orchid plants. However, because of the dilemma the euglossine bees face—in which energy content rises linearly with nectar sugar concentration, whereas viscosity rises exponentially—, E. imperialis collect more dilute nectars, relative to their lapping bee counterparts, with sucrose concentrations between approximately 30 to 40%. During the actual ingestion, the glossa of E. imperialis is generally fully extended and stationary, stretching 6 mm beyond the apical end of the feeding tube formed by the galeae and the labial palps. Therefore, the shift in capillary-based lapping to suction feeding for E. imperialis, although decreasing nectar sugar concentration, maximizes the rate of energy intake for each individual bee.

=== Fragrance collection ===
1,4-cineole

Studies of male E. imperialis show elevated levels of territorial behavior when provided with a fragrant chemical, cineole, which attracts other male bees. In addition, it has been observed that these male bees are likely to periodically abandon their territories to forage for chemicals thought to be important for attracting and mating with females. Males have been observed to actively collect aromatic chemicals, especially those produced by orchid flowers, while storing and modifying them in their hind tibiae for later use. Experiments have evidenced that younger male bees are relatively more active at chemical baits than nectar plants, indicating that many younger male bees have relatively no chemical stores to establish a territory and attract females, and must therefore commit more of their energy to foraging for chemicals. Older male bees were found to be relatively more common at nectar plants, indicating that as these male bees age, there is a decline in reproductive activity. However, when studied over time, male E. imperialis did not detectably decrease their fragrance stores in their hind tibiae over the course of two weeks of captivity, suggesting that continuous passive exposure is highly unlikely. Instead, this strongly supports the theory that an active mechanism is required to allow the male to trigger voluntary fragrance release at specific times, such as courting behavior, or other mating behaviors in which sex pheromones are released.

methyl salicylate

- Chemical Bait Study: A census study in Costa Rica including E. imperialis, shows that males of this species are attracted primarily to cineole, followed by methyl salicylate and methyl cinnamate. What this study was able to show, is that there is some degree representative of seasonal fluctuation of pollinators, which is slightly more intense in deciduous forest habitats than in rain forest habitats. However, when there is strong inter-habitat heterogeneity, such as is with the ability of euglossine bees to pollinate flowering orchid plants, a low percentage of pollen-laden bees could result.
- Resource 'Hot Spots': As plants bloom and die, resource ‘hot spots’ for chemical fragrances wax and wane throughout the year. This means that temporal changes, especially between seasons, shift euglossine bee preferences for certain chemical fragrances over others. For E. imperialis, there is a marginally significant trend (P = 0.07) in chemical preference, which largely deals with preferring the chemical cineole during later times in the year as opposed to methyl salicylate. Another factor which may change fragrance preference in the local fragrance environment for euglossine bees is a shift in the wind direction, which may cause another fragrance ‘hot spot’ to be included in the odor plume.

=== Territorial display ===
Male E. imperialis have been observed to occasionally form aggregations of territories considered to be leks. These aggregations typically occur at sites in which they can collect aromatic materials; however, females almost never approach these aggregations. It is also important to note that although leks are formed, they are only facultative for this species (the more suitable sites, the greater the number of habitable territories). Since these territories are aggregated, females have a large selection of males with whom to potentially mate with in the aggregation. Territorial behavior of male E. imperialis consists of two primary components: displaying on the perch and patrolling its territory. During display, the male ‘stands’ on the perch with its head pointed up, and touching the trunk of the tree with its mandibles closed. Only the fore and hind legs touch the tree trunk, in which the forelegs bend and are held besides the head, whereas the hind-legs are held straight away from the body. During its display, the male would also ‘hop’ on-and-off the tree, about 2 cm from the perch, accompanied by a loud buzzing sound. Shortly after displaying, the male then engages in patrol behavior, flying an irregular elliptical path around its territory. This cycle of displaying and patrolling repeats continuously as long as the male remains in its territory and is undisturbed by intruding males. Male E. imperialis are considered to have two types of territories: ‘primary territories’ and ‘secondary territories’. In primary territories, they are almost always defended by males, and is the site for all male-male confrontations. In secondary territories, they are defended for only 1 to 2 hours a day. Secondary territories often serve as a transitional territory for males attempting to move into primary territories by challenging the resident males. Weather also plays a significant role in territorial defense behavior, such that in heavy rain, males would often abandon their territories for the rest of the day. On dark, overcast days, there is also little to no activity.

=== Mating behavior ===
Receptive females are the ones to locate male territories by examining tree-falls or large light gaps within their foraging ranges. Female E. imperialis behavior, when entering a territory, initially resembles that of an intruding male. The female flies up within 5 cm of the resident male and hovers until the male flies out to investigate. The male and female then engage in a tight circular flight path, less than 20 cm apart, until the female lands on the perch of the tree. The female then presses its body close to the tree trunk, with its wings held down. The male then lands on her dorsum to copulate with the female, which lasts a brief 5 seconds. After mating, the female then immediately leaves the territory. It is also important to note that mating only occurs in relatively solitary territories in which no other males are present. It is theorized that female E. imperialis possibly only mate once in their lifetime due to the fact that a very limited number of female foraging ranges actually overlap with any given male territory.

=== Inter/intra-species conflict behavior ===
Normally only occurring when a resident male of a primary territory is challenged by an intruding male, intra-species conflict is often fleeting, typically lasting 60 seconds or less. Both males typically engage each other by flying around each other, occasionally bumping, within 0.5 to 1.0 m circles. No actual grappling would occur, and this behavior would continue until one male, typically the intruder, leaves. Male E. imperialis typically ignore members of other species, both bees and animals, in the immediate area of their perch and vicinity of their territories. However, Solenopsis ants have a parasitic relationship with E. imperialis, since they enter some of the cells from below the nest and rob the cell contents.

=== Nesting behavior ===
Each nest is occupied by several adult females. When a larva matures in its cell, it lays down a layer of silk threads on the cell walls, then coats it with layers of a smooth and shiny substance, creating a sort of cocoon. The larva then defecates and smears its feces in vertical streaks on the inside of the cocoon to cover the lower half of the inner wall. This behavior is unique in E. imperialis, but the reason for its behavior is still unknown. Males, after emerging from their cells, leave immediately and have been observed to never re-enter the nest.

=== Flight behavior ===
Since E. imperialis is an important pollinator to orchid species, they experience excessive loads to carry in their hind tibiae for maneuvers, nectar loading, and mate or prey transport. Thus, aerial agility and mobility is a necessary adaptation that bees of this species must acquire. Studies have shown that the energy E. imperialis bees expend on hovering in normal atmospheric conditions is not representative of their maximum aerodynamic performance capabilities. Bee muscle power output is proportional to the product of contraction frequency, muscle strain, and myofibrillar stress; for E. imperialis, the easiest method of enhancing power output is solely relying on increasing muscle strain by increasing the wing stroke amplitude approximately 40-50%. In short, the total inertial power required can be stored in the elastic elements of the thorax, and then subsequently released to reaccelerate the wings for greater lift.

== Human interaction ==
Euglossa imperialis appear to be a shy species when it comes to human interaction. Multiple experiments done with E. imperialis have all noted that tagging territorial males often ends in failure since they leave the vicinity altogether when people walk within 1.5 to 2.0 m of their territories.

=== Population decline ===
Sharp pronounced declines in tropical euglossine bee populations at both the native and human-managed levels, have raised serious concerns over a possible global pollination crisis. Since many tropical plant taxa, especially flowering orchid plants, strongly rely on euglossine bee pollinators for cross-fertilization, declining euglossine bee populations could lead to widespread pollen limitation and low reproductive rates. This decline is most likely attributable to human activity such as habitat disturbance—habitat degradation, pervasive pesticide use, pathogen spillover, forest fragmentation, and climatic alteration.

- Diploid Male Decline: Studies have shown that populations of E. imperialis have unusually high frequency of diploid males induced by chronically low N (population size), most likely due to the long-ranged dispersed nature of being a non-social bee. Population size fluctuates dramatically over time, and male reproductive success is strongly affected by the complex chemical fragrances they collect from flowers, both of which considerably reduce N. Therefore, the high frequency of diploid males for E. imperialis is a sensitive indicator for genetic diversity and allelic loss.
