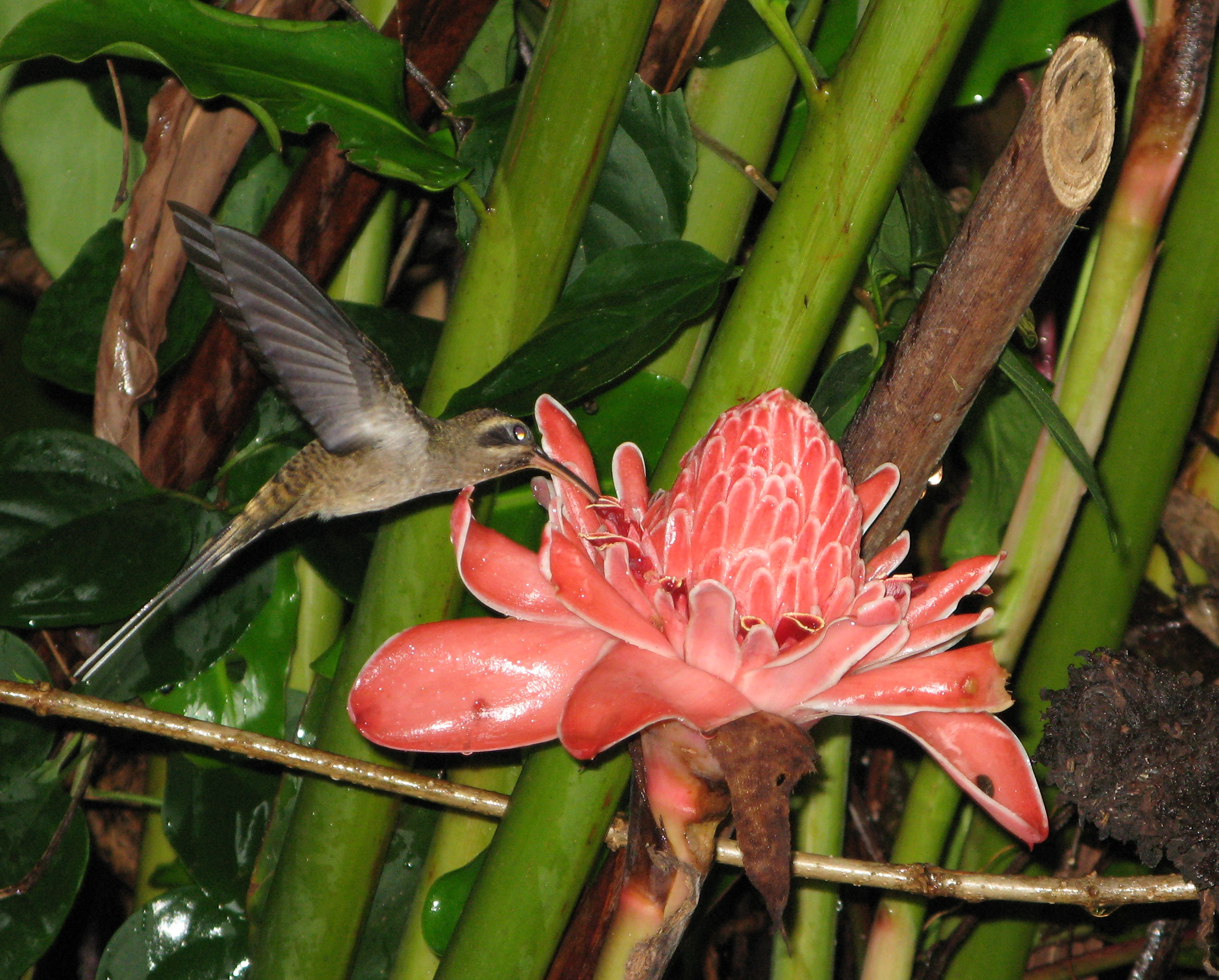
- Photographed in Drake Bay, Costa Rica

Conservation status
- Least Concern (IUCN 3.1)
- CITES Appendix II

Scientific classification
- Kingdom: Animalia
- Phylum: Chordata
- Class: Aves
- Order: Apodiformes
- Family: Trochilidae
- Genus: Phaethornis
- Species: P. longirostris

Binomial name
- Phaethornis longirostris (Delattre, 1843)

= Long-billed hermit =

Species of hummingbirdbird

The long-billed hermit (Phaethornis longirostris) is a bird in the family Trochilidae, the hummingbirds. It is found from central Mexico south through Central America, Colombia and Ecuador into Peru.

== Taxonomy and systematics ==
It has often been considered conspecific with what is now the long-tailed hermit, P. superciliosus, which is found east of the Andes. The two populations were called the western and eastern long-tailed hermits; the "eastern" was dropped after the split into two species and the renaming of the western population.

The South American Classification Committee (SACC) of the American Ornithological Society, the International Ornithological Committee (IOC), and the Clements taxonomy assign these four subspecies to the long-billed hermit:

- P. l. longirostris Delattre (1843)
- P. l. cephalus Bourcier & Mulsant (1848)
- P. l. susurrus Bangs (1901)
- P. l. baroni Hartert (1897)

However, BirdLife International's Handbook of the Birds of the World (HBW) treats P. l. baroni as a separate species, "Ecuadorian hermit". The SACC in 2006 had rejected that treatment. Other subspecies within longirostrus and cephalus have been proposed but have not been accepted.

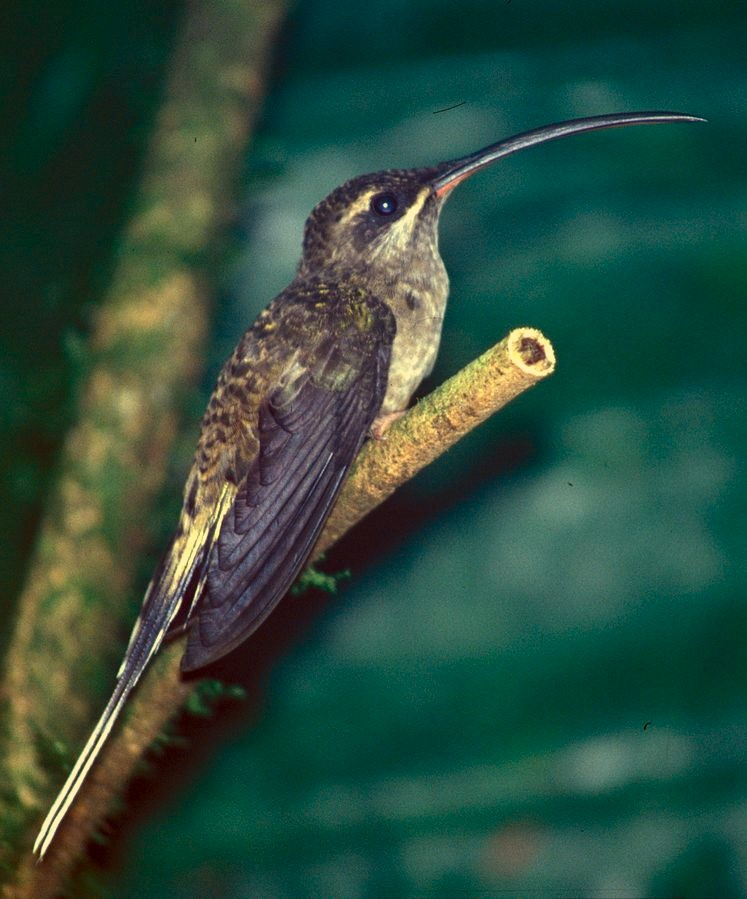
P. l baroni ("Ecuadorian hermit")

== Description ==
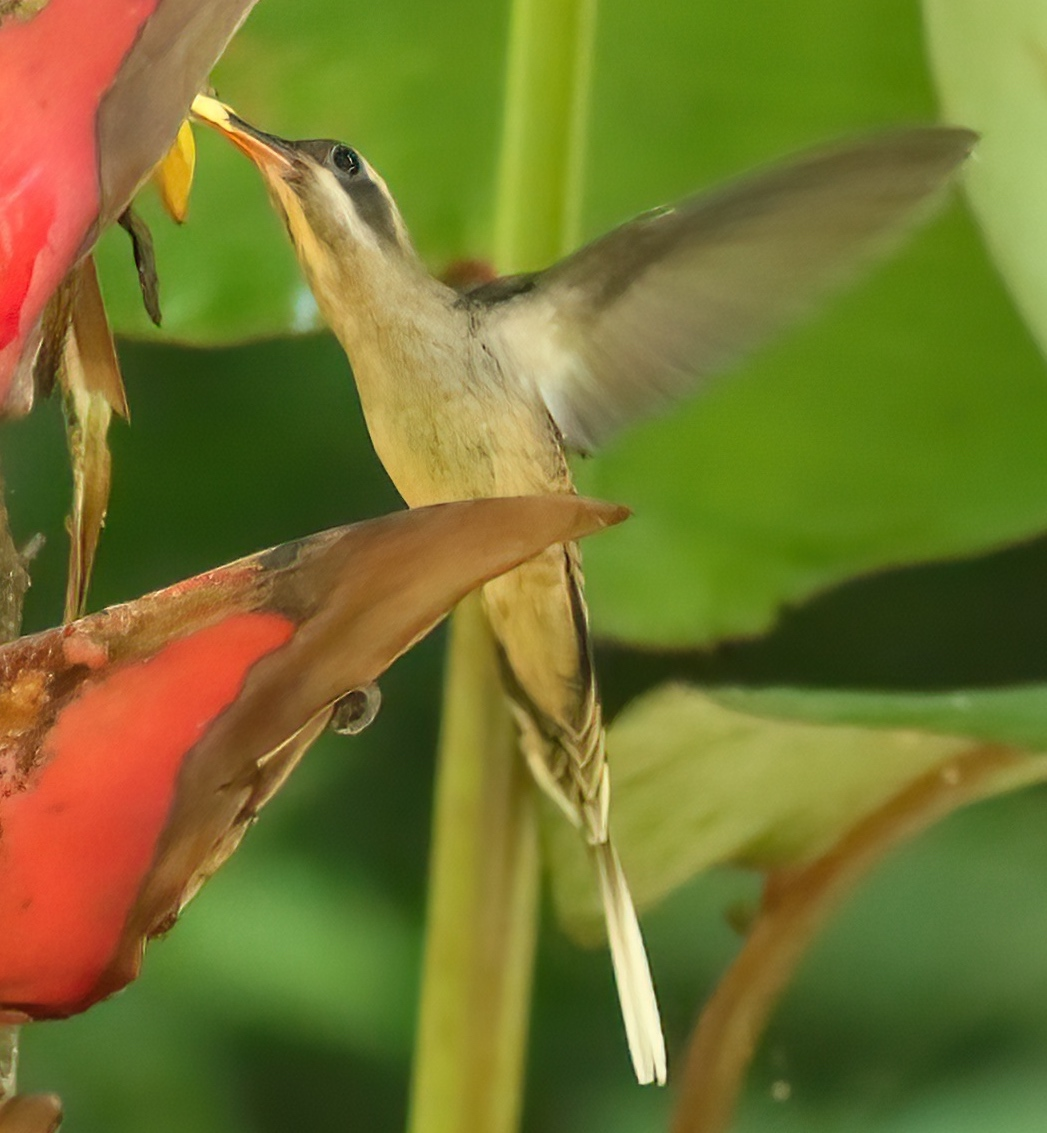
Selva Verde Lodge - Costa Rica

The long-billed hermit is 13 to 16 cm (5.1 to 6.3 in) long. Males weigh 5 to 7.5 g (0.18 to 0.26 oz) and females 4 to 6.5 g (0.14 to 0.23 oz). The nominate subspecies P. l. longirostris has greenish-brown upperparts and brownish to grayish underparts. Its uppertail coverts have dark and light ochre bands and the central tail feathers are long with long white tips. It has a long decurved bill, with the female's being shorter but more curved than the male's. P. l. cephalus is similar but its underparts become more ochraceous towards the southern part of its range. P. l. susurrus is larger than cephalus but similarly colored. P. l. baroni's upperparts are dull metallic green and its belly is whiter than those of the other subspecies.

== Distribution and habitat ==
The subspecies of long-billed hermit are found thus:

- P. l. longirostris, from Mexico's Oaxaca and Chiapas states south through Guatemala into northern Honduras
- P. l. cephalus, from eastern Honduras through Nicaragua, Costa Rica, and Panama into northwestern Colombia as far south as Santander Department
- P. l. susurrus, the isolated Sierra Nevada de Santa Marta in northeastern Colombia
- P. l. baroni, from Ecuador's western Esmeraldas Province south into Peru's Tumbes and Piura departments.

The species inhabits the understory and edges of a variety of landscapes including rainforest, tall secondary forest, humid semi-deciduous forest, cloudforest, and gallery forest. It has been recorded from sea level to 1,000 m (3,300 ft) in Costa Rica, to 1,500 m (4,900 ft) in eastern Mexico, to 2,500 m (8,200 ft) in northern Colombia, to 400 m (1,300 ft) in Peru, and to at least 1,300 m (4,300 ft) and possibly to 1,700 m (5,600 ft) in Ecuador.

== Behavior ==
=== Movement ===
The long-billed hermit is not known to make large-scale movements but is thought to wander short distances.

=== Feeding ===
The long-billed hermit is a "trap-line" feeder like other hermit hummingbirds, visiting a circuit of a variety of flowering plants for nectar. Examples include Heliconia, Costus, Aphelandra, and Passiflora. It also consumes small arthropods.

=== Breeding ===
The long-billed hermit's breeding seasons vary considerably throughout its range, from April to July in Mexico, May to September in Panama, and January to April or May in Colombia. The nest is a cone-shaped cup made of plant fibers and spider silk suspended from the underside of a drooping leaf. The clutch size is two eggs; The incubation period is 17 to 18 days with fledging 22 to 23 days after hatch.

During the breeding season, male long-billed hermits sing in communal leks of up to 25 birds, and also wiggle their long tails in display. Competitive lek singing can occupy half of the daylight hours to attract females. In addition, mature males have a longer bill than females, and appear to use its dagger-like tip as a secondary sexual trait to defend against other males at the lek.

=== Vocalization ===
The songs of the three northern subspecies of long-billed hermit are "a continuous series of single, piercing, usually upslurred 'sweeup' notes". Their call is "a sharp, explosive 'week!'" that is often given in flight. The song of P. l. baroni is "a continuous series of single, sparrow-like, chipping notes...'tchee..tchee..tchee..'." Its call is "a thin 'seep'" also given in flight.

== Status ==
The IUCN follows HBW taxonomy, and so has separately assessed the long-billed hermit and "Ecuadorian hermit" as being of Least Concern. The population sizes and trends of both are unknown. P. l. susurrus has a small range that potentially places it at risk. P. l. cephalus occurs in many protected areas in Costa Rica. P. l. baroni is considered fairly common throughout its range and occurs in some protected areas.
