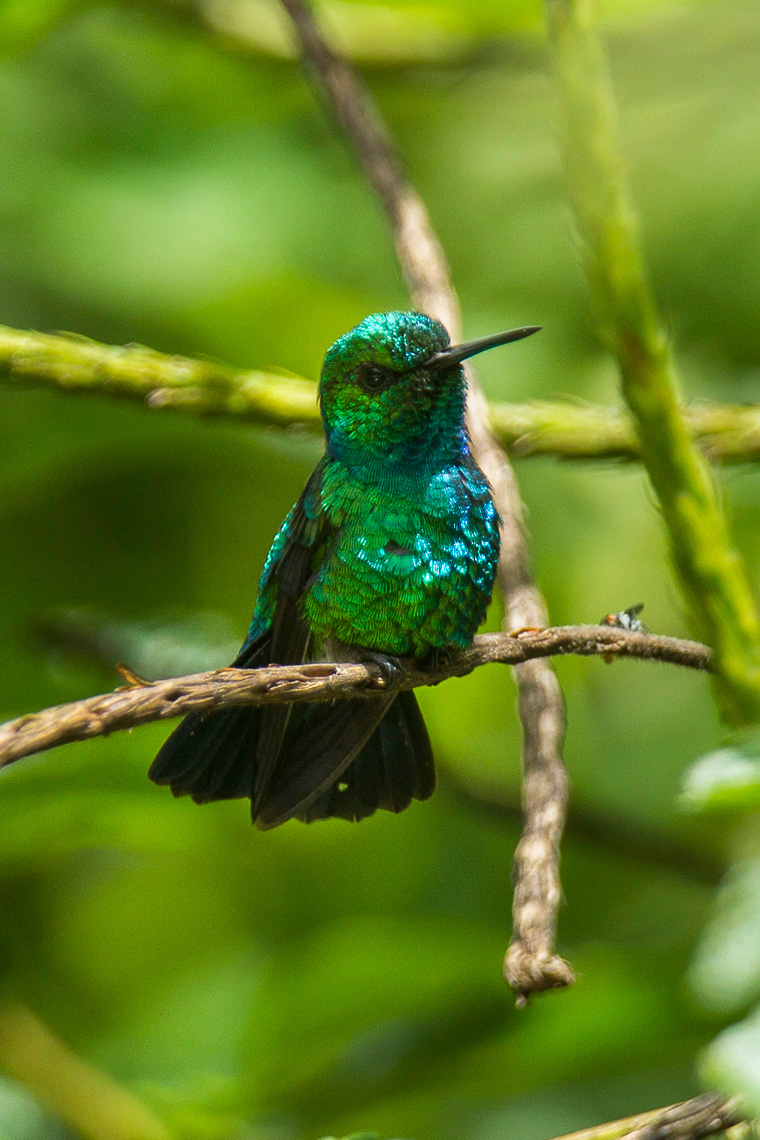
- Blue-tailed emerald

Scientific classification
- Kingdom: Animalia
- Phylum: Chordata
- Class: Aves
- Order: Apodiformes
- Family: Trochilidae
- Tribe: Trochilini
- Genus: Chlorostilbon; Gould, 1853

Type species
- Chlorostilbon prasinus Gould, 1853=Trochilus pucherani Bourcier & Mulsant, 1848

Species
- See text

= Chlorostilbon =

Genus of birds

Chlorostilbon is a genus of hummingbird in the family Trochilidae, known as emeralds (as are some hummingbirds in the genera Amazilia and Elvira). A single species, the blue-chinned sapphire is variously placed in the monotypic genus Chlorestes or in Chlorostilbon. The taxonomy of the C. mellisugus superspecies is highly complex and, depending on view, includes 1-8 species. All species in this genus have straight black or black-and-red bills. The males are overall iridescent green, golden-green or bluish-green, and in some species the tail and/or throat is blue. The females have whitish-grey underparts, tail-corners and post-ocular streak.

== Taxonomy ==
The genus Chlorostilbon was introduced in 1853 by the English ornithologist John Gould to accommodate a single species to which Gould gave the binomial name Chlorostilbon prasinus. This taxon is now considered a subspecies of the glittering-bellied emerald Chlorostilbon lucidus pucherani.

== Species ==
The genus contains ten species:

Male	Female	Common name	Scientific name	Distribution
		Blue-tailed emerald	Chlorostilbon mellisugus	
		Chiribiquete emerald	Chlorostilbon olivaresi	
		Red-billed emerald	Chlorostilbon gibsoni	
		Glittering-bellied emerald	Chlorostilbon lucidus	
		Short-tailed emerald	Chlorostilbon poortmani	
		Narrow-tailed emerald	Chlorostilbon stenurus	
		Green-tailed emerald	Chlorostilbon alice	
		Coppery emerald	Chlorostilbon russatus	
		Garden emerald	Chlorostilbon assimilis	
		Western emerald	Chlorostilbon melanorhynchus	

== Gallery ==
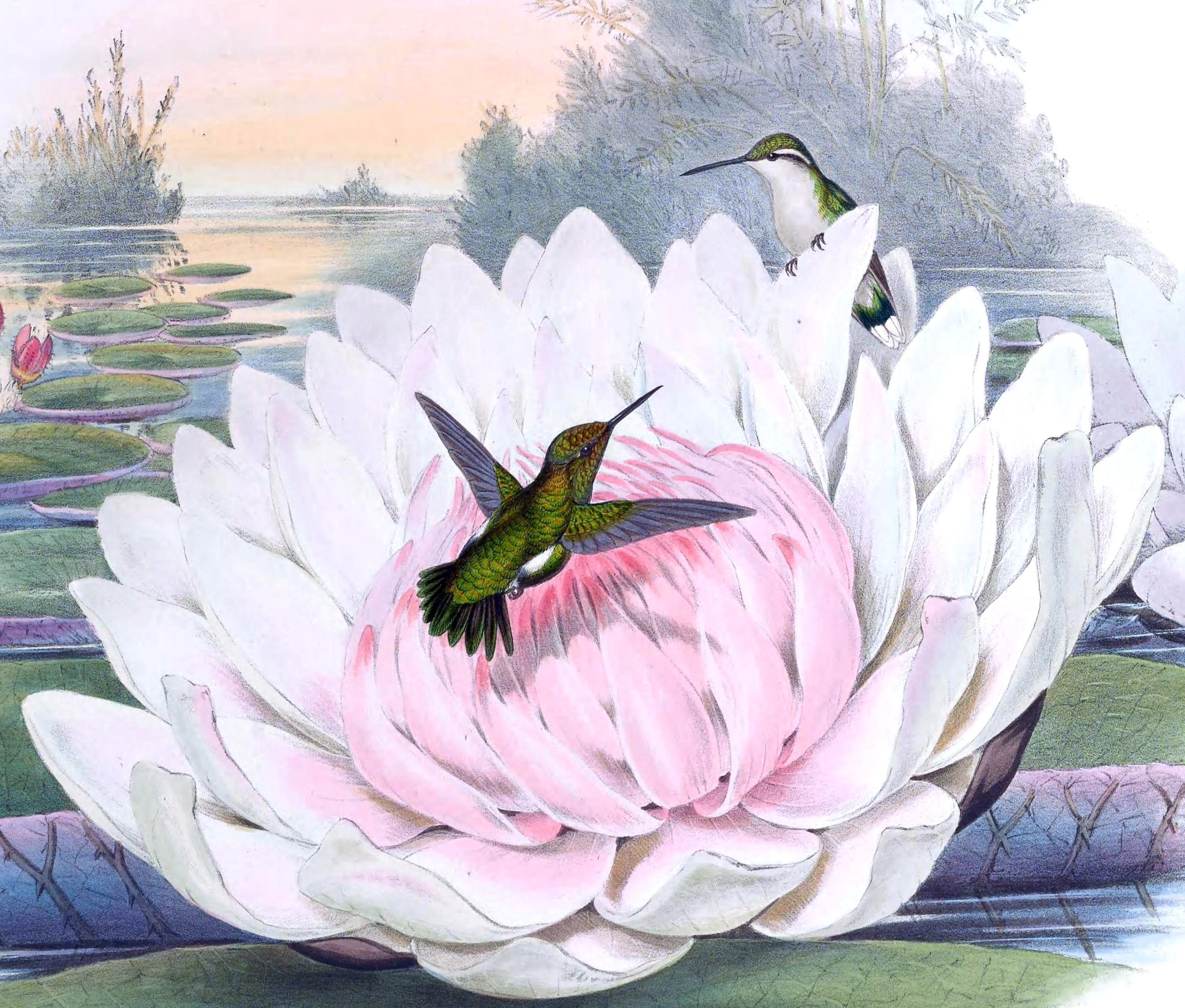
Short-tailed emerald, by John Gould

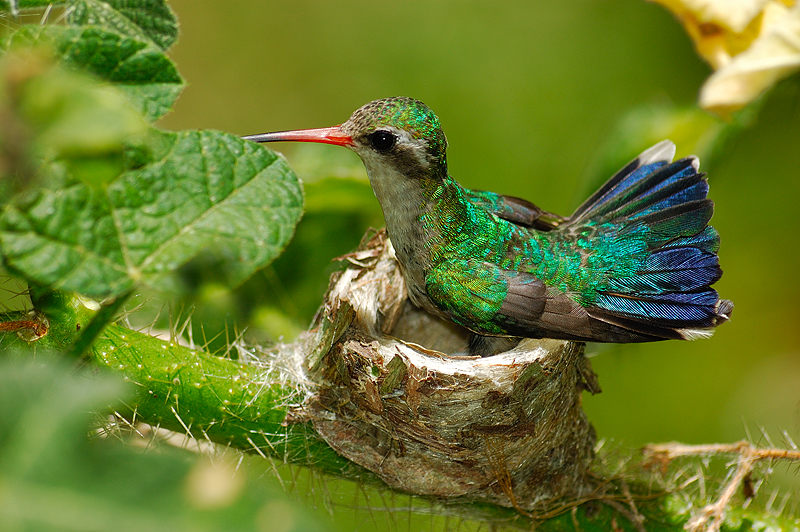
Glittering-bellied emerald
