= Chiribiquete emerald =

Conservation status
- Least Concern (IUCN 3.1)
- CITES Appendix II

Scientific classification
- Kingdom: Animalia
- Phylum: Chordata
- Class: Aves
- Order: Apodiformes
- Family: Trochilidae
- Genus: Chlorostilbon
- Species: C. olivaresi

Binomial name
- Chlorostilbon olivaresi Stiles, 1996

Species of hummingbird

The Chiribiquete emerald (Chlorostilbon olivaresi) is a species of hummingbird in the "emeralds", tribe Trochilini of subfamily Trochilinae. It is endemic to southern Colombia.

== Taxonomy and systematics ==
The Chiribiquete emerald was first described in 1996. Its specific epithet olivaresi honors Fr. Antonio Olivares to recognize his contributions to Colombian ornithology and his persisting effort in building a bird collection for the Instituto de Ciencias Naturales of the Universidad Nacional de Colombia.

It is monotypic.

== Description ==
The Chiribiquete emerald is 8.5 to 9 cm (3.3 to 3.5 in) long. Males weigh about 3.8 g (0.13 oz) and females about 3.6 g (0.13 oz). The male's bill has a black maxilla and a red mandible with a black tip. The male's upperparts are metallic green, the uppertail coverts bluish green, and the tail dark steel blue with a shallow fork. The sides of its head and neck reflect golden green. Its throat and upper breast are glittering blue-green and the rest of the underparts bright metallic green. The female's bill is black with a red tinge at the base of the mandible. The female is metallic bronze green above and pale gray below. It has a dusky face and a white stripe behind the eye. Most of its tail is bluish green; the outer feathers have gray bases, a dark blue band near the end, and white tips.

== Distribution and habitat ==
The Chiribiquete emerald is restricted to the Serranía de Chiribiquete, a range of flat-topped mountains straddling south central Colombia's Guaviare and Caquetá departments. There it primarily inhabits the open scrub and savanna of the range's middle and upper elevations. It also occurs in the forest at somewhat lower elevations but shuns the lowlands that surround the mesas. In elevation it ranges between 800 and 1,600 m (2,600 and 5,200 ft).

== Behavior ==
=== Movement ===
The Chiribiquete emerald is believed to be sedentary.

=== Feeding ===
The most important source of nectar for the Chiribiquete emerald is the low shrub Decagonocarpus cornutus. It takes nectar from the flowers of other shrubs and trees as well. It does not appear to defend feeding territories. It captures small insects by sallies through gaps in the vegetation and also gleans them from flowers and foliage.

=== Breeding ===
The Chiribiquete emerald probably breeds during the dry season of December to May. Its nest has not been described and nothing else is known about its breeding phenology.

=== Vocalization ===
The Chiribiquete emerald's song has not been described. When foraging it gives "a sharp, dry, scratchy 'cht'" call.

== Status ==
The IUCN has assessed the Chiribiquete emerald as being of Least Concern, though it occupies a limited range and its population size and trend are unknown. Most of its habitat is within Chiribiquete National Park and the mountaintops have little human activity, so "there would appear to be no imminent threat to the species."
