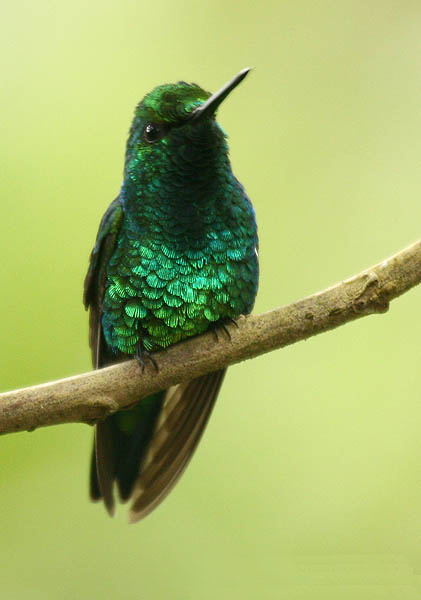
- Male in NW Ecuador

Conservation status
- CITES Appendix II

Scientific classification
- Kingdom: Animalia
- Phylum: Chordata
- Class: Aves
- Order: Apodiformes
- Family: Trochilidae
- Genus: Chlorostilbon
- Species: C. melanorhynchus

Binomial name
- Chlorostilbon melanorhynchus Gould, 1860

Synonyms
- Chlorostilbon mellisugus melanorhynchus

= Western emerald =

Species of hummingbird

The western emerald (Chlorostilbon melanorhynchus) is a species of hummingbird in the "emeralds", tribe Trochilini of subfamily Trochilinae. It is found in Colombia and Ecuador.

== Taxonomy and systematics ==
The western emerald was originally described as a species and later treated as a subspecies of the blue-tailed emerald (Chlorostilbon mellisugus). Since the early 2000s the South American Classification Committee (SACC) of the American Ornithological Society, the International Ornithological Committee (IOC), and the Clements taxonomy have again treated it as a species in its own right. However, as of 2020 BirdLife International's Handbook of the Birds of the World (HBW) retained it as the C. mellisugus subspecies.

The IOC treats the western emerald as monotypic. The SACC and Clements recognize two subspecies, the nominate C. m. melanorhynchus and C. m. pumilus, though the SACC accepts that the latter "might not be recognizable". HBW treats melanorhynchus and pumilis as subspecies of blue-tailed emerald.

== Description ==
The western emerald is 10.9 to 11.4 cm (4.3 to 4.5 in) long and weighs about 2.6 g (0.092 oz). Both sexes of both subspecies have a short black bill. The nominate male has an iridescent green forehead and crown with gold highlights, a bright green face, shining bronzy green upperparts, and a steel blue tail. Its underparts are glittering emerald green, with greater iridescence and a blue tinge on the breast. It has white thigh tufts. The female has a bronzy green forehead and crown and a blackish face with a pale gray spot behind the eye. The rest of its upperparts are metallic grass green and the tail is blue-black with white tips. Its underparts are pale gray to white with a buffy tone on the throat and belly. C. m. pumilus, when treated separately, differs only by having a slightly shorter bill and a brighter crown than the nominate.

== Distribution and habitat ==
The western emerald is found from the Western Andes of Colombia south into Ecuador. C. m. melanorhynchus occurs in the upper subtropical zone of Colombia and the temperate zone in Ecuador. C. m. pumilus is found at lower elevations, in the arid and semi-arid tropical and subtropical zones. In Colombia it ranges between elevations of 1,000 and 2,000 m (3,300 and 6,600 ft). In the northwestern Ecuadoran valleys it occurs between 1,500 and 2,700 m (4,900 and 8,900 ft) and mostly between 600 and 1,800 m (2,000 and 5,900 ft) elsewhere in Ecuador. It has been recorded as low as sea level and as high as 3,050 m (10,000 ft).

The western emerald inhabits open to semi-open landscapes such as the edges and clearings of mature forest, plantations, cultivated areas and fields, and gardens.

== Behavior ==
=== Movement ===
The western emerald is generally sedentary but might make limited seasonal elevational changes.

=== Feeding ===
The western emerald usually feeds at fairly low levels. Almost nothing else is known about its feeding strategy or diet because most observations are published as the blue-tailed emerald without distinguishing the subspecies.

=== Breeding ===
The western emerald's breeding season in Colombia appears to span from January to June. As is the case with feeding, most observations of its breeding phenology are published as the blue-tailed emerald without distinguishing the subspecies.

=== Vocalization ===
The western emerald's song is "a continuous series of subdued scratchy and wheezy notes... sometimes preceded by a few introductory notes, witsitsitsi...chirr..chirr..chirr..chirr.. or tsit-trr, tsit-trr, tsit-trr, tsit-trr...." Its calls include "a soft tsip, pit, and chwep."

== Status ==
The IUCN follows HBW taxonomy and so has not assessed the western emerald separately from the blue-tailed emerald. It "[r]eadily accepts man-made habitat and is fairly common across its range."
