= Trap-lining =

Feeding strategy amongst certain families of birds

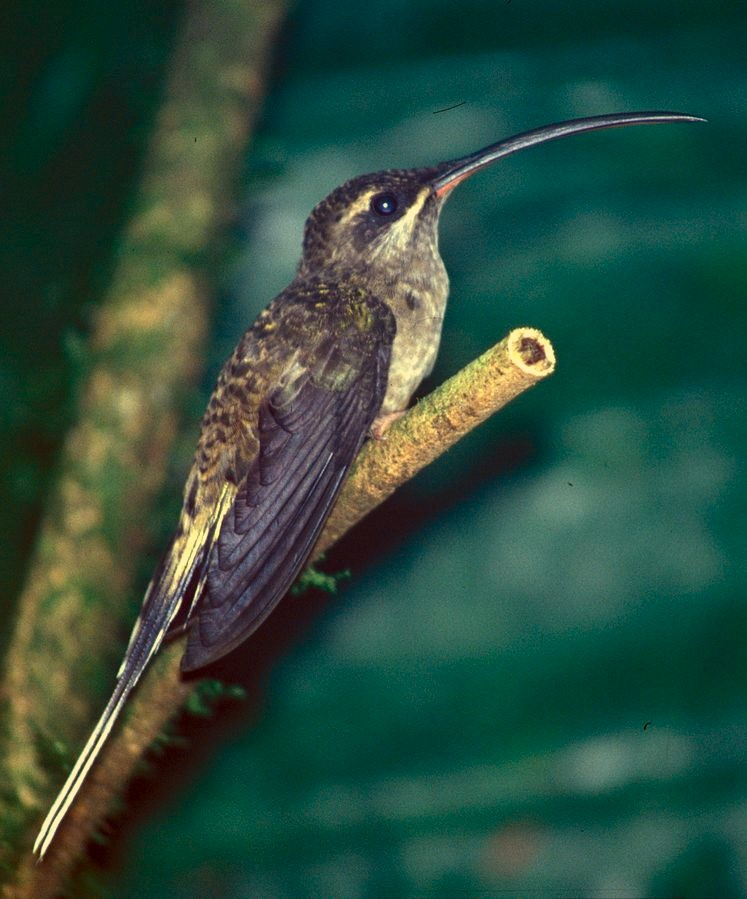
Long-billed hermit (Phaethornis longirostris baroni), a species of traplining hummingbird adapted for flying long distances

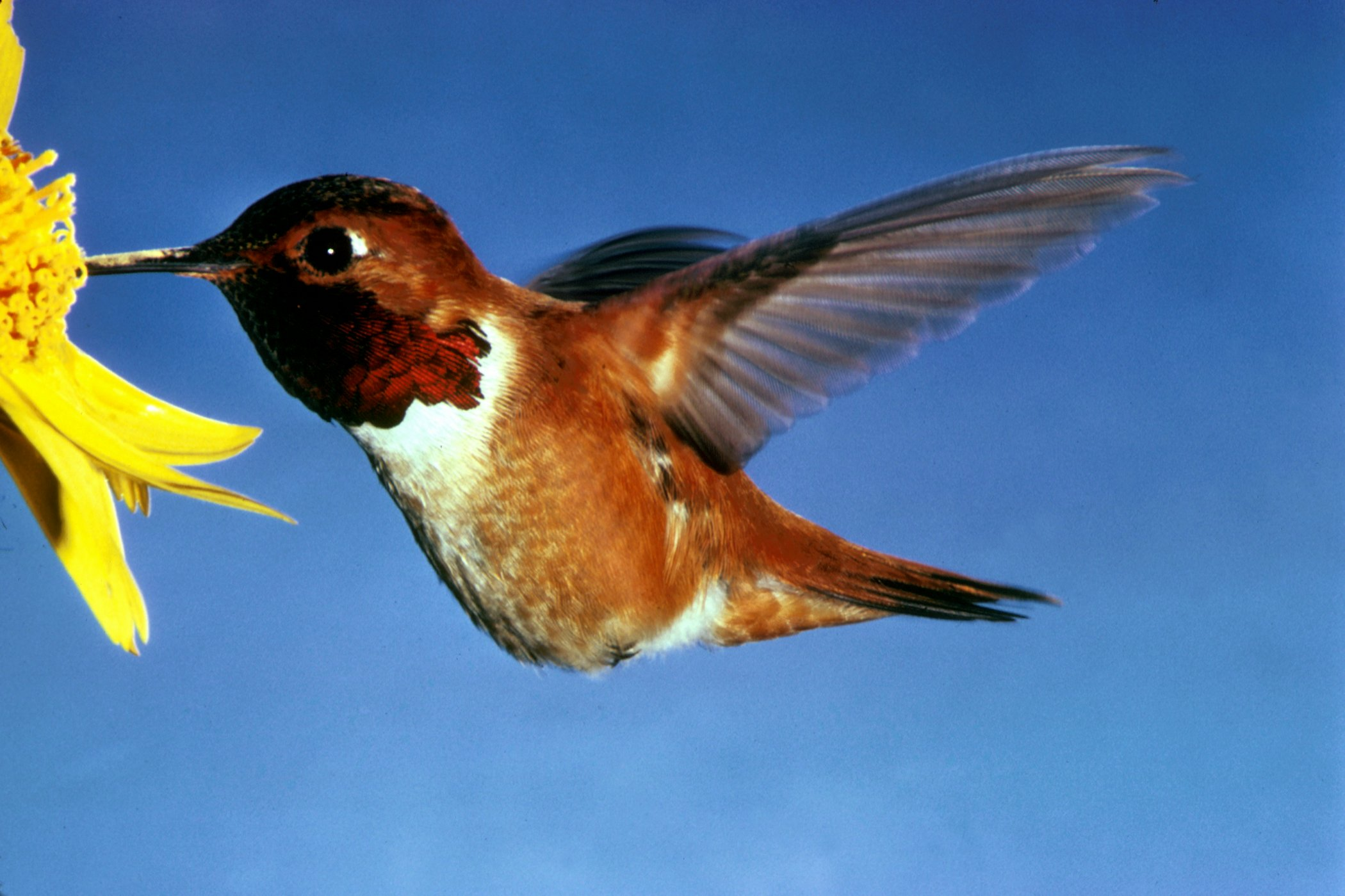
Rufous hummingbird (Selasphorus rufus), a species of territorial hummingbird, is more robust than traplining species

In ethology and behavioral ecology, trap-lining or traplining is a feeding strategy in which an individual visits food sources on a regular, repeatable sequence, much as trappers check their lines of traps. Traplining is usually seen in species foraging for floral resources. This involves a specified route in which the individual traverses in the same order repeatedly to check specific plants for flowers that hold nectar, even over long distances. Trap-lining has been described in several taxa, including bees, butterflies, tamarins, bats, rats, and hummingbirds and tropical fruit-eating mammals such as opossums, capuchins and kinkajous. Traplining is used to term the method in which bumblebees and hummingbirds go about collecting nectar, and consequently, pollinating each plant they visit. The term "traplining" was originally coined by Daniel Janzen, although the concept was discussed by Charles Darwin and Nikolaas Tinbergen.

== Behavioral response ==
In the instance of hummingbirds and bumblebees, traplining is an evolutionary response to the allocation of resources between species. Specifically, individual hummingbirds form their own specific routes in order to minimize competition and maximize nutrient availability. Some hummingbird species are territorial (e.g. rufous hummingbird, Selasphorus rufus,) and defend a specific territory, while others are trapliners (i.e. Long-billed hermit, Phaethornis longirostris) and constantly check different locations for food. Because of this, territorial hummingbirds will be more robust, while traplining hummingbirds have adaptations such as longer wings for more efficient flying. Traplining hummingbirds will move from source to source, obtaining nectar from each. Over time, one hummingbird will be the primary visitor to a particular source. In the case of bumblebees, when competitors are removed, there is an influx to the removal area and less time is spent traplining over long distances. This demonstrates the ability to behaviorally adapt based on surrounding competition. In addition, bumblebees use traplining to distinguish between high nectar-producing flowers and low-nectar producing flowers by consistently recognizing and visiting those that produce higher levels. Other types of bees, such as with euglossine bees (i.e. Euglossa imperialis) use traplining to forage efficiently by flying rapidly from one precise flowering plant to the next in a set circuit, even ignoring newly blooming plants which are adjacent, but outside, of its daily route. By doing so, these euglossine bees significantly reduce the amount of time and energy spent searching for nectar each day. In general, it is seen that traplining species have higher nutritional rewards than non-traplining species.

== Energy conservation ==
Traplining hummingbirds are known to be active proportionally to nectar production in flowers, decreasing throughout the day. Therefore, traplining hummingbirds can spend less time foraging, and obtain their energy intake from a few number of flowers. Spending less time searching for food means less energy spent flying and searching. Traplining bumblebees prioritize their routes based on travel distance and reward quantity. It is seen that the total distance of the trapline is related to the abundance of the reward (nectar) in the environment.

== Spatial cognition and memory ==
Traplining can also be an indication of the levels of spatial cognition of species that use the technique. For example, traplining in bumblebees is an indication that bumblebees have spatial reference memory, or spatial memory, that is used to create specific routes in short term foraging. The ability to remember specific routes long-term cuts down foraging and flying time, consequently conserving energy. This theory has been tested, showing that bumblebees can remember the shortest route to the reward, even when the original path has been changed or obstructed. Additionally, bees cut down the amount of time spent revisiting sites with little or no nutritive reward. Bees with access to only short-term memory forage inefficiently.

== Advantages ==
One of the main advantages of traplining is that the route can be taught to other members of the population quickly or over a period of hours, leading all members to a reliable food source. When the group works together on finding a particular source of food they can quickly establish where it is and get the route information transferred to all the individuals in the population. This ensures that the entire community is able to quickly find and consume the nutrients that are needed.

Traplining helps foragers that are competing for resources that replenish in a decelerating way. For example, nectar in a plant is slowly replaced over time, while acorns only occur once a year. Traplining can help plant diversity and evolution by keeping pollen with different genetics flowing from plant to plant. It is mostly pollinators that use traplining as a way to ensure they always know where the food sources they are looking for are. This means that organisms like bumblebees and hummingbirds can transfer pollen anywhere from the starting point of the route to the final food source along the path. Since the path is always the same, it greatly reduces the risk of self-pollination (iterogamy) because the pollinator won't return to the same flower on that particular foraging session.

Overall, plant species that are visited by trapliners have increased fitness and evolutionary advantages. Because of this mutualistic relationship between traplining hummingbirds and plants, traplining hummingbirds have been referred to as "legitimate pollinators", while territorial hummingbirds have been referred to as "nectar thieves". If an organism that traplines learns where a food source is once, they can always return to that food source because they can remember minute details about the location of the source. This allows them to adapt quickly if one of the major sources suddenly becomes scarce or destroyed.

== Disadvantages ==
Serious obstacles, such as the arrangement of plant life, can hamper traplining. If the route zig zags through the understory of the tropical rainforest, some of the organisms using the route can get lost because of very subtle changes, such as a treefall gap or heavy rainfall. This could cause an individual to be separated from the entire group if it isn't able to find the path back to the original route. Some food sources can be overlooked because the traplining route in use does not lead the organisms to the area that these resources are in.

Since the route is very specific, the organisms following it may also miss out on opportunities to come in contact with potential mates. Male bumblebees going directly to the source of food have been observed to pass up on female bumblebees as potential mates that are along the same path, preferring to continue foraging and bring food back to the hive. This can take away from species diversification and could possibly delete some traits in the gene pool that are useful.

== Research ==
Observing traplining in the natural world has proven to be very difficult and little is known about how and why species trapline, but the study of traplining in the natural environment does take place. In one particular study, individual bees trained on five artificial flowers of equal reward were observed traplining between those five flowers. When a new flower of higher reward gets included in the group, the bees subsequently adjust their trapline to include the higher reward flower. Under natural conditions they hypothesized that it would likely be beneficial for bees to prioritize higher reward flowers to either beat out competition or conserve energy.

In other field experiments, ecologists created a "competition vacuum" to observe whether or not bumblebees adjusted their feeding routes based on intense direct competition between other bumblebees. This study showed that bees in areas of higher competition are more productive than the control bees. Bumblebees opportunistically adjust their use of traplining routes in response to activity of other competing bees. Another effective way to study the behavior of traplining species is via computer simulation and indoor flight cage experiments. Simulation models can be made to show the linkage between pollinator movement and pollen flow. This model considers how service by the pollinators with different foraging patterns would affect the flow of pollen.

Indoor flight cage experiments allow for easier determination between test subjects and easier observation of behavior and patterns. Bees in small study environments seem to demonstrate less traplining tendencies than bees that were studied in environments that stretched over several hectares. A larger working area increases the need for traplining techniques to further conserve energy and maximize nutrient intake and that bees most often trapline due strictly to travel distance. The bees remember these complex flight paths by breaking them into small segments using vectors, landmarks and other environmental factors, each one pointing to the next destination.

Despite a long history of research on bee learning and navigation, most knowledge has been deduced from the behavior of foragers traveling between their nest and a single feeding location. Only recently, studies of bumblebees foraging in arrays of artificial flowers fitted with automated tracking systems have started to describe the learning mechanisms behind complex route formation between multiple locations. The demonstration that all these observations can be accurately replicated by a single learning heuristic model holds considerable promises to further investigate these questions and fill a major gap in cognitive ecology.

== See also ==
- Optimal foraging theory
