= Neem cake =

By-product of neem tree fruits and kernels

Neem cake organic manure is the by-product obtained in the process of cold pressing of neem tree fruits and kernels, and the solvent extraction process for neem oil cake. It is a potential source of organic manure under the Bureau of Indian Standards, Specification No. 8558. Neem has demonstrated considerable potential as a fertilizer. For this purpose, neem cake and neem leaves are especially promising. Puri (1999), in his book Neem : The Divine Tree Azadirachta, has given details about neem seed cake as manure and nitrification inhibitor. The author has described that, after processing, neem cake can be used for partial replacement of poultry and cattle feed.

== Components ==
Neem cake has an adequate quantity of NPK in organic form for plant growth. Being a totally botanical product it contains 100% natural NPK content and other essential micro nutrients as N (Nitrogen 2.0% to 5.0%), P (Phosphorus 0.5% to 1.0%), K (Potassium 1.0% to 2.0%), Ca (Calcium 0.5% to 3.0%), Mg (Magnesium 0.3% to 1.0%), S (Sulphur 0.2% to 3.0%), Zn (Zinc 15 ppm to 60 ppm), Cu (Copper 4 ppm to 20 ppm), Fe (Iron 500 ppm to 1200 ppm), Mn (Manganese 20 ppm to 60 ppm). It is rich in both sulphur compounds and bitter limonoids.

According to research calculations, neem cake seems to make soil more fertile due to an ingredient that blocks soil bacteria from converting nitrogenous compounds into nitrogen gas. It is a nitrification inhibitor and prolongs the availability of nitrogen to both short duration and long duration crops.

== Use as a fertilizer ==
Neem cake organic manure protects plant roots from nematodes, soil grubs and termites, probably due to its residual limonoid content. It also acts as a natural fertilizer with pesticidal properties. Neem cake is widely used in India to fertilize paddy, cotton and sugarcane. Usage of neem cake have shown an increase in the dry matter in Tectona grandis (teak), Acacia nilotica (gum arabic), and other forest trees.

Neem seed cake can also reduce alkalinity in soil, as it produces organic acids upon decomposition. Being totally natural, it is compatible with soil microbes and rhizosphere microflora and hence ensures fertility of the soil. Neem cake improves the organic matter content of the soil, helps improve soil texture, water holding capacity, and soil aeration for better root development.

== Pest control ==
Neem cake is effective in the management of insects and pests. The bitter principles of the soil and cake have been reported to have seven types of activity: (a) antifeedant, (b) attractant, (c) repellent, (d) insecticide, (e) nematicide, (f) growth disruptor and (g) antimicrobial.

The cake contains salannin, nimbin, azadirachtin, meliantriol and azadiradione as the major components. Of these, azadirachtin and meliantriol are used as locust antifeedants while salannin is used as an antifeedant for the housefly.

== See also ==
- Arid Forest Research Institute (AFRI)
- Neem
- Neem oil
- Azadirachtin
- Organic farming
