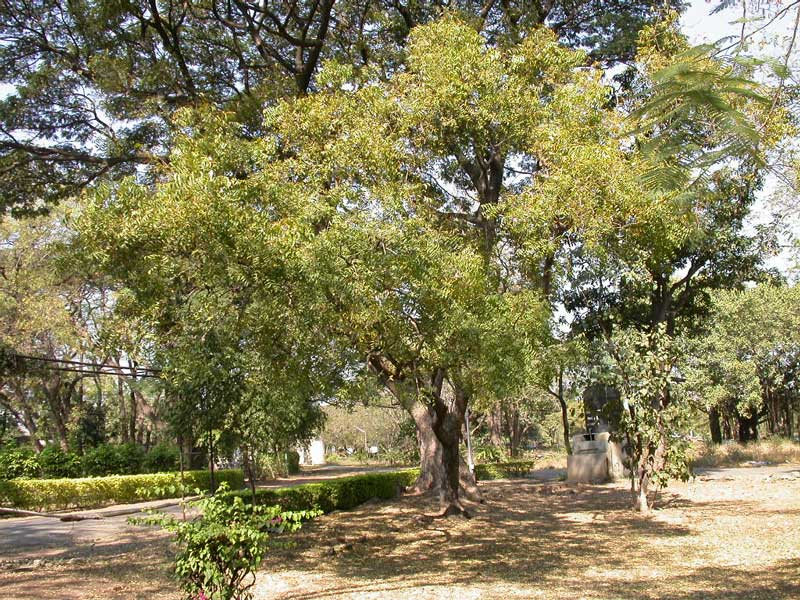
- Azadirachta indica

Scientific classification
- Kingdom: Plantae
- Clade: Tracheophytes
- Clade: Angiosperms
- Clade: Eudicots
- Clade: Rosids
- Order: Sapindales
- Family: Meliaceae
- Subfamily: Melioideae
- Genus: Azadirachta; A.Juss.

Species
- See text.

= Azadirachta =

Genus of flowering plants

Azadirachta is a genus of two species of trees in the mahogany family Meliaceae. Numerous species have been proposed for the genus but only two are currently recognized, Azadirachta excelsa and the economically important tree Azadirachta indica, the neem tree, from which neem oil is extracted. Both species are native to the Indomalaysian region, and A. indica is also widely cultivated and naturalized outside its native range.

Medicinal properties have been attributed to the resin derived from the trees in the traditional medicine of India. One of the components of this resin has been found to be an effective insecticide; see azadirachtin. Another component is an effective anti-fungal; see Azadirachta indica.

These species should not be confused with Melia azedarach, which is a tree in a different genus of the family Meliaceae.

== Taxonomy ==
The genus Azadirachta was established by Adrien-Henri de Jussieu in 1830. In 1753, Carl Linnaeus had described two species, Melia azedarach and Melia azadirachta. De Jussieu considered Melia azadirachta to be sufficiently different from Melia azedarach to be placed in a new genus, Azadirachta, as Azadirachta indica. For both his species, Linnaeus referred to the name 'azedarach', which is derived from the French 'azédarac', which in turn is from the Persian 'āzād dirakht' (ازادرخت), meaning 'free or noble tree'.

=== Species ===
As of March 2023, Plants of the World Online accepted two species:

- Azadirachta excelsa (Jack) Jacobs
- Azadirachta indica A.Juss.
