= Azadiradione =

Chemical compound

Names
- IUPAC name [(5R,7R,8R,9R,10R,13S,17R)-17-(Furan-3-yl)-4,4,8,10,13-pentamethyl-3,16-dioxo-6,7,9,11,12,17-hexahydro-5H-cyclopenta[a]phenanthren-7-yl] acetate
- Other names 24-Norchola-1,14,20,22-tetraene-3,16-dione, 7-(acetyloxy)-21,23-epoxy-4,4,8-trimethyl-, (5alpha,7alpha,13alpha,17alpha)-

Identifiers
CAS Number	26241-51-0
3D model (JSmol)	Interactive image
ChEBI	CHEBI:67280
ChEMBL	ChEMBL1215754
ChemSpider	25044638
MeSH	azadiradione
PubChem CID	12308714
CompTox Dashboard (EPA)	DTXSID40949106
- InChI: InChI=1S/C28H34O5/c1-16(29)33-23-14-20-25(2,3)22(31)8-11-26(20,4)19-7-10-27(5)21(28(19,23)6)13-18(30)24(27)17-9-12-32-15-17/h8-9,11-13,15,19-20,23-24H,7,10,14H2,1-6H3/t19-,20+,23-,24-,26-,27-,28-/m1/s1 Key: KWAMDQVQFVBEAU-HMWIRDDCSA-N
- SMILES: CC(=O)O[C@@H]1C[C@@H]2[C@](C=CC(=O)C2(C)C)([C@@H]3[C@@]1(C4=CC(=O)[C@H]([C@@]4(CC3)C)C5=COC=C5)C)C

Properties
Chemical formula	C_{28}H_{34}O_{5}
Molar mass	450.575 g·mol^{−1}
Density	1.2±0.1 g/cm^{3}
Vapor pressure	0.0±1.5 mmHg
- Except where otherwise noted, data are given for materials in their standard state (at 25 °C [77 °F], 100 kPa). Infobox references

Azadiradione is a naturally occurring compound found in several plants, most notably the neem tree (Azadirachta indica). It is a tetracyclic triterpenoid.

== Sources ==
Azadiradione is the principal active ingredient in neem oil, which is extracted from the seeds of the neem tree. Smaller quantities of azadiradione can also be found in other plants like Cedrela odorata (Spanish cedar), Chisocheton spp., Xylocarpus granatum (cannonball mangrove) and Azalea indica (common azalea).

== Applications ==
Azadiradione acts as an antioxidant and has been used in traditional medicine in Asia, Africa and the Middle East for ages.

Research suggests azadiradione may have properties that fight microbes (bacteria, fungi, viruses), reduce inflammation, protect cells from damage, and even have anti-cancer effects.

Azadiradione may also act as a natural pesticide, potentially controlling some insects and pests.
