= Methyl 2-fluoroacrylate =

Names
- Preferred IUPAC name Methyl 2-fluoroprop-2-enoate
- Other names Methyl 2-fluoroacrylate 2-Fluoro-2-propenoic acid methyl ester 2-Fluoroacrylic acid methyl ester

Identifiers
CAS Number	2343-89-7
3D model (JSmol)	Interactive image
ChemSpider	2062679
ECHA InfoCard	100.133.340
PubChem CID	2782524
UNII	3P6DG2B57G
CompTox Dashboard (EPA)	DTXSID80382134
- InChI: InChI=1S/C4H5FO2/c1-3(5)4(6)7-2/h1H2,2H3 Key: ZTZJVAOTIOAZGZ-UHFFFAOYSA-N; InChI=1/C4H5FO2/c1-3(5)4(6)7-2/h1H2,2H3 Key: ZTZJVAOTIOAZGZ-UHFFFAOYAB
- SMILES: COC(=O)C(=C)F

Properties
Chemical formula	C_{4}H_{5}FO_{2}
Molar mass	104.080 g·mol^{−1}
Appearance	transparent liquid
Density	1.114 g/mL @ 20 °C
Melting point	−42 °C (−44 °F; 231 K)
Boiling point	91 °C @ 750 mmHg
Solubility in water	slightly soluble
Refractive index (n_{D})	1.39 @ 20 °C
- Except where otherwise noted, data are given for materials in their standard state (at 25 °C [77 °F], 100 kPa). Infobox references

Methyl 2-fluoroacrylate (MFA) is a chemical compound classified as an acrylate ester. The molecular formula is C_{4}H_{5}FO_{2} and the molecular weight is 104.08. The systematic name of this chemical is methyl 2-fluoroprop-2-enoate. It is used in industrial chemistry to produce acrylate polymers with mechanical and optical properties, and insect antifeedant 2-azabicyclo[2.1.1]hexane.

== Hazards ==
MFA is highly flammable and can be harmful if inhaled, in contact with skin, or if swallowed. It is irritating to eyes, respiratory system, and skin.
