= Nimbin =

Nimbin may refer to:

- Nimbin, New South Wales, a village in the Northern Rivers area of Australia
- Nimbin (chemical), a chemical found in Azadirachta indica (Neem tree)
- MV Nimbin, merchant ship
