= Azadirachtin =

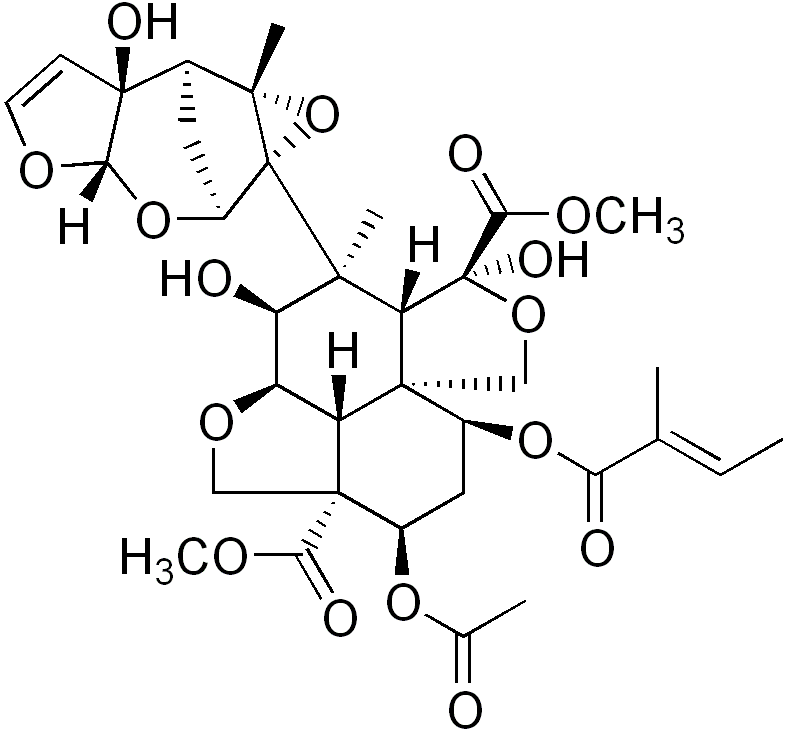

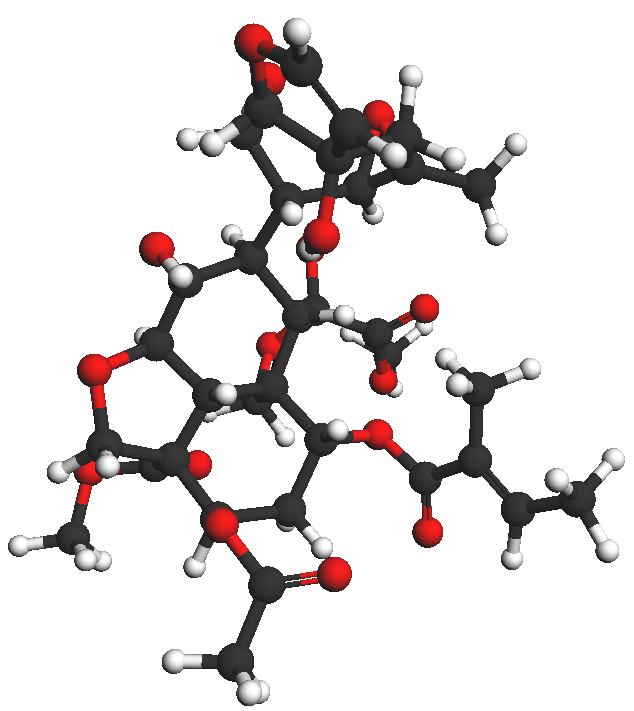

Names
- Preferred IUPAC name Dimethyl (2aR,2a^{1}R,3S,4S,4aR,5S,7aS,8S,10R,10aS)-10-(acetyloxy)-3,5-dihydroxy-4-[(1aR,2S,3aS,6aS,7S,7aS)-6a-hydroxy-7a-methyl-3a,6a,7,7a-tetrahydro-2,7-methanofuro[2,3-b]oxireno[2,3-e]oxepin-1a(2H)-yl]-4-methyl-8-{[(2E)-2-methylbut-2-enoyl]oxy}octahydro-1H,7H-naphtho[1,8-bc:4,4a-c′]difuran-5,10a(8H)-dicarboxylate

Identifiers
CAS Number	11141-17-6
3D model (JSmol)	Interactive image
ChEBI	CHEBI:2942
ChemSpider	4444685
ECHA InfoCard	100.115.924
KEGG	C08748
PubChem CID	5281303
UNII	O4U1SAF85H
CompTox Dashboard (EPA)	DTXSID0037497
- InChI: InChI=1S/C35H44O16/c1-8-15(2)24(38)49-18-12-19(48-16(3)36)32(26(39)43-6)13-46-21-22(32)31(18)14-47-34(42,27(40)44-7)25(31)29(4,23(21)37)35-20-11-17(30(35,5)51-35)33(41)9-10-45-28(33)50-20/h8-10,17-23,25,28,37,41-42H,11-14H2,1-7H3/b15-8+/t17-,18+,19-,20+,21-,22-,23-,25+,28+,29-,30+,31+,32+,33+,34+,35+/m1/s1 Key: FTNJWQUOZFUQQJ-NDAWSKJSSA-N
- SMILES: O=C(OC)[C@@]1(O)OC[C@]82[C@@H](OC(=O)/C(=C/C)C)C[C@@H](OC(=O)C)[C@@]7(C(=O)OC)CO[C@@H]([C@@H](O)[C@](C)([C@H]12)[C@]64O[C@]6([C@@H]3[C@@]5(O)/C=C\O[C@H]5O[C@H]4C3)C)[C@@H]78

Properties
Chemical formula	C_{35}H_{44}O_{16}
Molar mass	720.721 g·mol^{−1}
- Except where otherwise noted, data are given for materials in their standard state (at 25 °C [77 °F], 100 kPa). verify (what is ?) Infobox references

Azadirachtin, a triterpenoid chemical compound belonging to the limonoid group, is a secondary metabolite present in neem seeds. It is an insecticide used particularly in organic farming.

== Occurrence ==
Azadirachtin is found in the neem tree, Azadirachta indica, from which its name is derived, as well as Azadirachta excelsa. It is found in all parts of the tree but the highest concentration is in the seeds (0.2 to 0.8 percent by weight). It was first isolated pure in 1968 following the antifeedant activity towards the desert locust (Schistocerca gregaria), but its chemical structure was finally established later in the 1980s.

== Use ==
The neem tree has been used for > 2,000 years in India for the control of insect pests. Azadirachtin is the major active component and is responsible for 72 to 90% of the biological activity. There are >100 limonoids in neem extracts, some of which are insecticidally active. Normally an unpurified extract is sold, which is known to delay resistance, when compared to pure azadirachtin. It is active against > 600 species, showing both antifeedant and insecticidal activity, although its insecticidal activity is more relevant for its commercial use. It is categorised by the EPA as a biopesticide and is approved for organic farming. In California, a state with good usage data, 2585 kg were used in 2023. The list of azadirachtin containing products is long; Kiliani lists 15 of them and mentions dozens more.

=== Toxicity and ecotoxicity ===
Azadirachtin shows low toxicity to mammals. It degrades rapidly in the environment. The risk to bees and other non-target arthropods is low. There is a low risk of killing beneficial insects apart from ladybird and lacewing. Azadirachtin is toxic to aquatic organisms.

== Mechanism of action ==
Azadirachtin interferes with a wide variety of insect pathways.

- The substance acts as an insect growth regulator. It antagonizes both ecdysteroid (mainly 20E) and juvenile hormone activities by reducing secretion of prothoracicotropic hormone (PTTH) and allatotropins (neuropeptides with pleotropic [see pleotropy] functions) from the corpus cardiacum complex. This neuroendocrine disruption reduces pupation. It also causes degeneration of other neuroendocrine glands.
- The substance disrupts reproductive functions, going as far as sterility in some insects. This is partially due to the aforementioned neuroendocrine disruption surrounding 20E and JH. It could also affect yolk protein and vitallogenin synthesis. It also reduces mating success by deterrence.
- The substance also deters feeding, making it an antifeedant. It disrupts the sense of smell to the point that some insects would rather starve than eat azadirachtin-laced food. If the insect ingests the compound, the substance further inhibits digestive enzymes and could leave an aversive taste memory by activating dopaminergic neurons.
- Azadirachtin additionally has a long list of cellular and molecular targets. It upregulates p53, disrupts protein synthesis possibly through binding to Hsp60, and changes the expression of many other pathways.

== Chemical synthesis ==
Azadirachtin has a complex molecular structure, with 16 stereogenic centres, 7 of which are tetrasubstituted. This makes its total synthesis from simple chemicals extremely challenging.

The first total synthesis took 22 years of work in the research group of Steven Ley at the University of Cambridge. The synthesis, published in 2007, is regarded as a landmark in total synthesis. It involves 71 reaction steps (48 steps in the longest linear sequence) with a yield of 0.00015%. The described synthesis was a relay approach, with the required, heavily functionalized decalin intermediate being made by total synthesis on a small scale, but being derived from the natural product itself for the gram-scale operations required to complete the synthesis. Chemical synthesis is not suitable for production, but was used to develop expertise and methodology in organic synthesis.

== Biosynthesis ==
The biosynthesis of azadirachtin is complex and only partially understood, as is the case for limonoids in general, but the first part of the sequence is established. Using transcriptome and genome mining and phylogenetic and homologous analysis, candidate genes were identified. They were heterologously expressed in Nicotiana benthamiana, and thus the metabolic steps were characterised and several of the purported intermediates isolated and characterised by NMR. Although the enzymes involved in the first part of the synthesis from 2,3-oxidosqualene to azadirone were characterised, it is not certain that the steps follow the order in the scheme. The later steps in the scheme from azadirone to azadirachtin are speculative.

== See also ==
- Neem
- Neem cake
- Neem oil
- Nimbin, another chemical isolated from Azadirachta indica also thought to contribute to the biological activity of neem
