= Nimbin (chemical) =

Names
- Preferred IUPAC name Methyl (2R,3aR,4aS,5R,5aR,6R,9aR,10S,10aR)-5-(acetyloxy)-2-(furan-3-yl)-10-(2-methoxy-2-oxoethyl)-1,6,9a,10a-tetramethyl-9-oxo-3,3a,4a,5,5a,6,9,9a,10,10a-decahydro-2H-cyclopenta[b]naphtho[2,3-d]furan-6-carboxylate

Identifiers
| CAS Number | 5945-86-8 |
| 3D model (JSmol) | Interactive image |
| ChEBI | CHEBI:67304 |
| ChemSpider | 97160 |
| ECHA InfoCard | 100.106.899 |
| PubChem CID | 108058 |
| UNII | N4CTG7K9IU |
| CompTox Dashboard (EPA) | DTXSID80208168 |
- InChI: InChI=1S/C30H36O9/c1-15-18(17-9-11-37-14-17)12-19-23(15)30(5)20(13-22(33)35-6)29(4)21(32)8-10-28(3,27(34)36-7)25(29)24(26(30)39-19)38-16(2)31/h8-11,14,18-20,24-26H,12-13H2,1-7H3/t18-,19-,20-,24-,25+,26-,28-,29+,30-/m1/s1 Key: NHOIBRJOQAYBJT-IMGVWCFESA-N; InChI=1/C30H36O9/c1-15-18(17-9-11-37-14-17)12-19-23(15)30(5)20(13-22(33)35-6)29(4)21(32)8-10-28(3,27(34)36-7)25(29)24(26(30)39-19)38-16(2)31/h8-11,14,18-20,24-26H,12-13H2,1-7H3/t18-,19-,20-,24-,25+,26-,28-,29+,30-/m1/s1 Key: NHOIBRJOQAYBJT-IMGVWCFEBM
- SMILES: O=C1\C=C/[C@@](C(=O)OC)([C@H]4[C@]1([C@H]([C@@]3(\C5=C(/C)[C@H](c2ccoc2)C[C@H]5O[C@@H]3[C@@H]4OC(=O)C)C)CC(=O)OC)C)C

Properties
| Chemical formula | C_{30}H_{36}O_{9} |
| Molar mass | 540.609 g·mol^{−1} |
| Melting point | 205 °C (401 °F; 478 K) |
- Except where otherwise noted, data are given for materials in their standard state (at 25 °C [77 °F], 100 kPa). Infobox references

Representation of nimbin analog N2

Nimbin is a triterpenoid isolated from the neem tree (Azadirachta indica). Nimbin is thought to be responsible for much of the biological activities of neem oil, and is reported to have anti-inflammatory, antipyretic, fungicidal, antihistamine and antiseptic properties. The neem tree is found in multiple Asian countries such as China, Thailand, and India. Nimbin is part of the chemical family of limonoids and triterpenoids. Nimbin was first extracted in 1942 from neem seeds by Siddiqi et al. Its molecular formula was established by mass-spectrometry along with salannin, a compound whose chemical formula and properties are very close those of nimbin. Nimbin can be extracted from different parts of the neem tree with a solvent or supercritical carbon dioxide. Nimbin is used for different purposes because it has multiple properties such as insecticide, antiviral, antimicrobial, anti-inflammatory, and anti-fungal. Nimbin was commonly used in traditional Indian and Chinese medicine. For example, it can be used to treat skin conditions like eczema and psoriasis.

Studies have also shown that it can be used to treat diseases caused by viruses such as the SARS COV-2 or the dengue virus. However, that hasn't been demonstrated in humans and only in laboratory settings. It was a derivative of nimbin (named N2) that was used in laboratories for the dengue virus and other uses like antimicrobial. Nimbin is relatively hydrophobic, and there has been a study to make it more hydrophilic with an inclusion complex which can be helpful to enable its direct use.

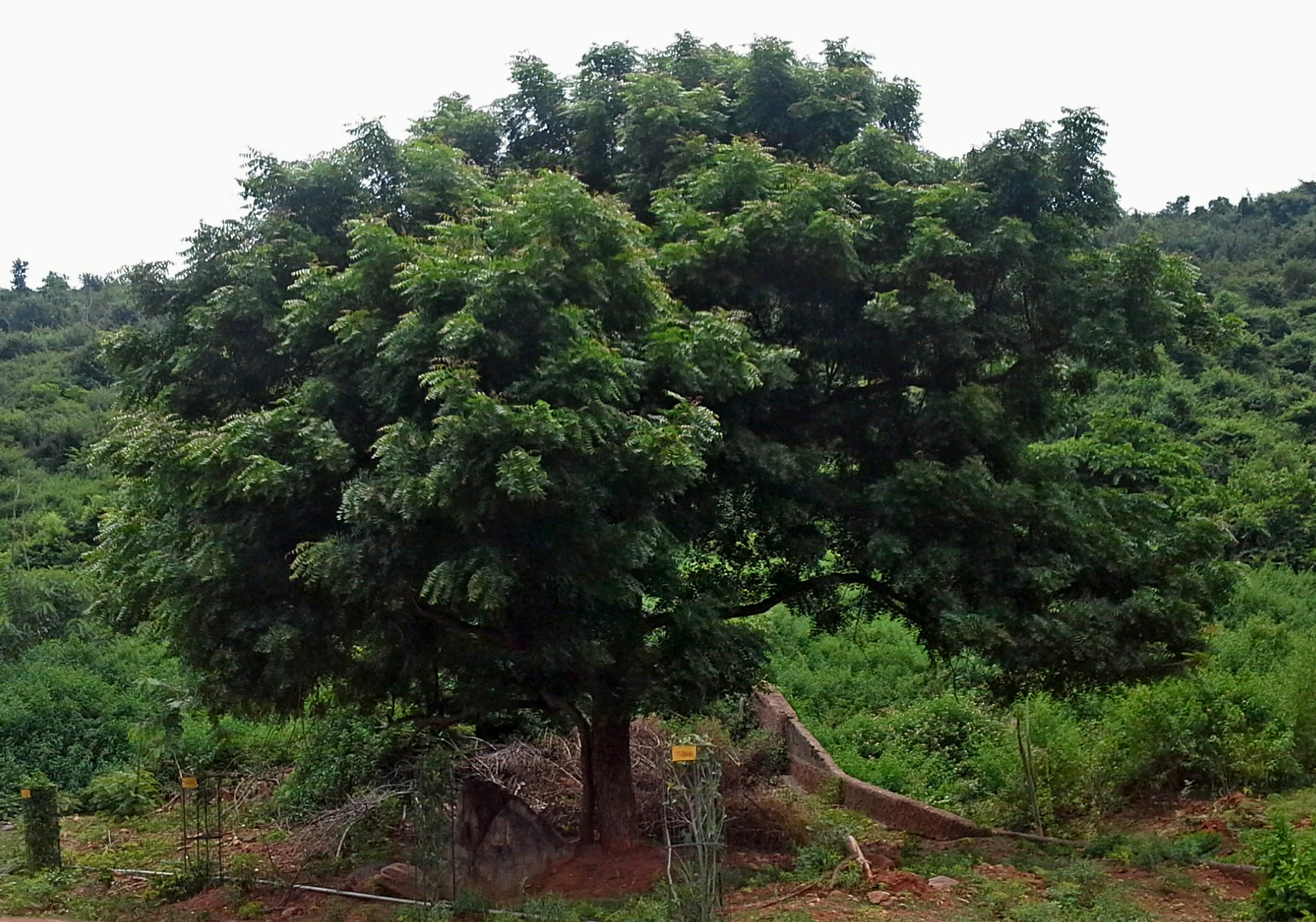
Neem tree

== Extraction of nimbin from neem ==
=== Quantification of nimbin in neem ===
Nimbin can be quantified in neem using advanced mass spectrometry or HPLC techniques. The concentration of this chemical in the plant (among other chemicals) can be impacted by various factors such as the different parts of the tree in which they can be found or tree age. Nimbin can be found in neem leaves, seeds and bark. This molecule can also be found in neem oil at 0.12%. Among the metabolites present in neem, nimbin is the least present chemical compound.

Nimbin biosynthesis is not influenced by environmental conditions (temperature, rainfall, humidity...) because neem trees from the same agro-climatic zone can have very different nimbin concentrations. Therefore, genetics can explain these differences in nimbin concentration in neem trees.

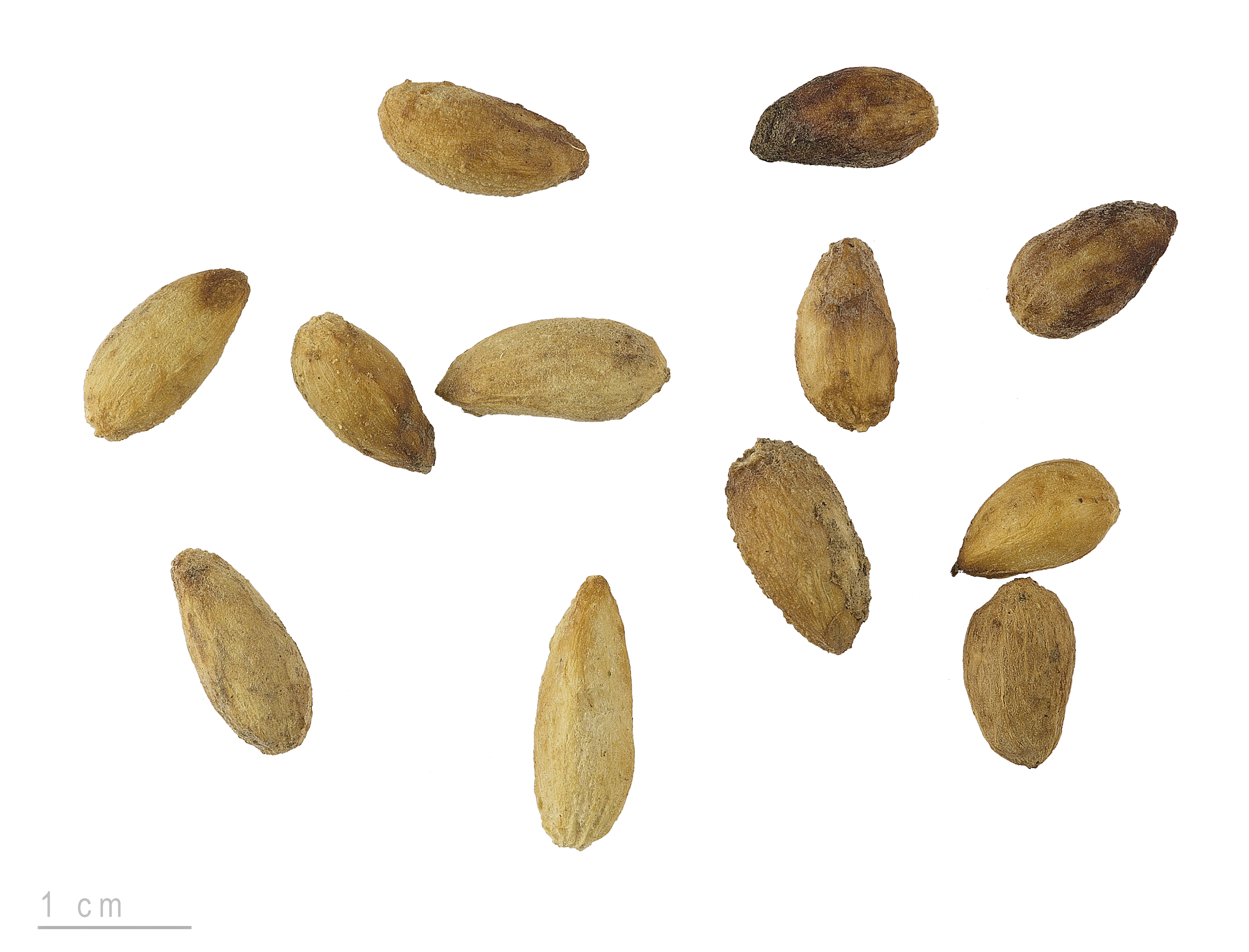
Neem seeds

=== Extraction with a solvent ===
Solvents can be used to extract nimbin out of neem seed kernels. The kernels are powdered and defatted with hexane and methanol. The product obtained is then filtered, concentrated under pressure and separated with ethyl acetate and water. The final crude is then purified by repeating different silica gel column chromatography with hexane and ethyl acetate (70:30) as a solvent. This method can obtain 600 mg of nimbin out of 300 g of neem seed kernels.

=== Extraction with supercritical carbon dioxide ===
To extract nimbin out of neem seeds, supercritical carbon dioxide can be used because of its low critical temperature and pressure and its low toxicity, which is why this method is mainly used in the industry. Even if supercritical carbon dioxide can sometimes fail to extract effectively organic compounds out of a product, extraction yields of nimbin out of neem seeds using this method are relatively high. In fact, under specific experimental conditions (305 K, 23 MPa and a carbon dioxide flow rate of 0.62 cm^{3}/min) an extraction yield of approximately 85% can be obtained for 2 g of neem. A co-solvent can also be added to supercritical carbon dioxide to enhance the extraction. In this case, methanol can be used as a co-solvent because it's a substantial donor of hydrogen bonds which is responsible for its high solvent power. However, using methanol as a co-solvent will only increase the extraction yield by 5% (which gives a yield of approximately 90%). Therefore, using a co-solvent is not worth it regarding the manipulation's cost, difficulty, and toxicity.

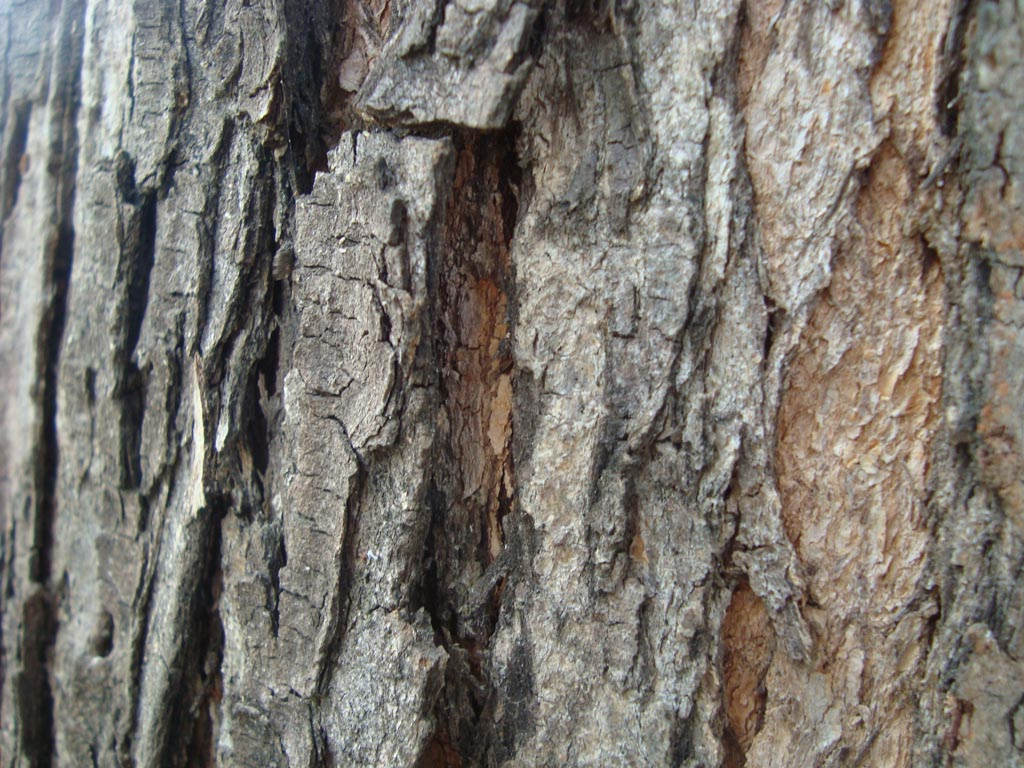
Neem bark

Some experimental parameters can have an impact on nimbin's extraction yield using this method. An increase in the pressure or of the carbon dioxide flow rate will increase the extraction yield. However, an increase in the temperature or of the average particle size of nimbin will decrease the extraction yield. If methanol is used as a co-solvent, an increase in its concentration will improve the extraction yield.

== Synthesis and derived molecules ==
=== Rearrangement of nimbin to isonimbin ===
The mechanism involves H^{+} ion coordination with ethereal oxygen of the C-ring followed by cleavage to form a more stable allyl carbocation at the C-13 and deprotonation of H-17 to form a diene. Successive intramolecular attack of the H^{+} on the tertiary carbocation leads to a 180^{o} rotation of bond between C-8 and C-14 and ring closure to produce the rearranged product with cyclic ether: Isonimbin. To obtain this product, nimbin was taken in a 100mL single-necked round bottom flask fitted with a guard tube, followed by 10mL acetonitrile. The solution is cooled to 0 °C, and 0.5ml of concentrated sulfuric acid is slowly added while stirring. The reaction is left until the room temperature is reached and mixed once again for 6 hours.

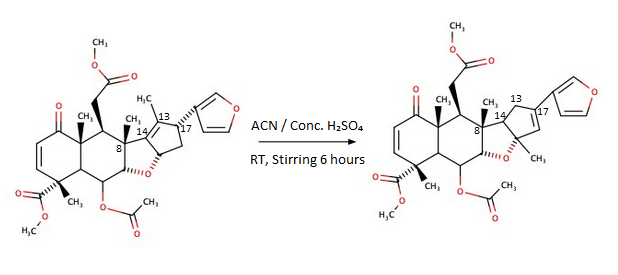
Chemical reaction - nimbin to isonimbin

Thin-layer chromatography monitored the completion of the reaction. After completion, the flask was immersed in an ice bath, and aqueous ammonia was added slowly until the pH reached 7-8. The solution was concentrated under reduced pressure using a rotary evaporator, poured into ice-cold water, and extracted using ethyl acetate. The crude product extract was purified using flash (under nitrogen) column chromatography, and the pure product was eluted at 16% ethyl acetate in hexane. (Isonimbin - Yield: 62%).

=== Semi-synthetic modification to a nimbin derivative: nimbolide to 6-homodesacetylnimbin and 6-desacetylnimbin ===
Nimbolide a natural compound has been isolated from the neem leaves and semi-synthetically modified into a nimbin's derived molecule to improve the bioefficacy of the compound.

A new product has been formed to induce steric hindrance by transesterifying the alkyl group in the –COOMe moiety of nimbolide using Titanium isopropoxide and ethanol 6-homodesacetylnimbin that has been identified through spectroscopic and crystallographic methods: IR band at 1712 cm^{−1} for the product and 1778 cm^{−1} for nimbolide, elution at 26,31 min for the product and 20,76 min for nimbolide.

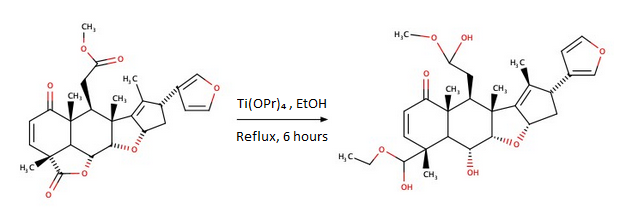
Chemical reaction - Nimbolide to 6-homodesacetylnimbin

The cytotoxic property of 6-homodesacetylnimbin was determined and compared with nimbolide, 6-desacetylnimbin, and nimbin. The absence of any activity and very little activity presented by nimbin and 6-desacetylnimbin shows that the lactone ring in nimbolide is crucial for anticancer activity.

However, the ED50 value for 6-homodesacetylnimbin illustrates moderate activity. Thus, steric hindrance through the presence of a large group or a lactone ring over the C-28 position may be crucial to transmit cytotoxic activity.

== Properties and applications ==
=== Hydrophobicity ===
==== Inclusion complex of nimbin and CD ====
The use of nimbin as a biopesticide or herbal medicine is limited by its low water solubility and bioavailability. To increase its water solubility, nimbin was put in an inclusion complex with different kinds of cyclodextrins (also called CDs). An inclusion complex is when one molecule forms a cavity where our targeted molecule can be. CDs are used since they have a hydrophilic outer surface but a hydrophobic central cavity (where nimbin will be).

The preparation of its saturated solution assessed the water solubility of the nimbin/CD complex. The results show that the water solubility of nimbin in the inclusion complex, compared with native nimbin, was remarkably increased by the solubilizing effects of different CDs.

=== Antiviral ===
Nimbin has antiviral properties. It could stop the virus from attaching to the cell since nimbin has a high bonding affinity to the viruses studied so far. Another possibility is that if the virus is already bond to its host cell, nimbin would inhibit its replicatation inside the host cell. However, nimbin's action is still unclear, and it may also depend on the type of virus.

==== SARS COV-2 ====
Nimbin is one of the molecules studied to see its effects on SARS-COV-2. It was first used because of its high binding affinity towards spike glycoprotein of SARS-COV-2. Nimbin can bond to ACE2, the cellular receptor of SARS-COV2. The main goal was that nimbin would get linked to the virus and that the binding would be stronger than the one between the virus and the host cell.

Nimbin is from the neem bark extract also called NBE. There has been an experiment in vitro where NBE could inhibit the pathologic effects of SARS-COV-2 infection on a human lung cell model. This proves that even though it isn't a direct experiment, we can anticipate that NBE-derived compounds such as nimbin will be able to prevent SARS-COV-2 infection of nasal and lung tissue in vivo as well.

Nimbin is one of the best-ranked drugs among the selected natural products showing an inhibitory effect for spike glycoprotein and ACE2 along with curcumin.

==== Dengue Virus ====
Nimbin is part of the family of triterpenoids, sub-category of terpenoids, that are known to have biological properties such as anti-viral properties. For the dengue virus (also called DENV NS2B-NS3) infection it shows potential in silico only.

The envelope of the dengue virus makes it so that the viral entry in the host cell is facilitated. Nimbin work against this envelope by blocking the virus from entering. It has shown that it is effective on all four types of dengue viruses (dengue 1-4) in silico.

=== Anti-inflammatory ===
An anti-inflammatory role has been demonstrated in both in vitro and in vivo models using nonsteroidal tetranortriterpenoid, nimbin (N1), and its analogs (N2 and N3).

They were able to improve wound healing by cell proliferation and to reduce the reactive oxygen species (a type of unstable molecule that contains oxygen and that easily reacts with other molecules in a cell).

For the experiences, all the reactions were produced with the commercially available starting materials without any further purifications. Nimbin has been isolated from the raw neem seed by crude extraction using methanol (MeOH), enriched neem fraction, and purified by doing multiple columns to obtain pure nimbin (N1). To obtain the derivatives N2 and N3, nimbin (N1) has been deacetylated using 1.1 equiv of K_{2}CO_{3}/MeOH under ambient conditions. Then both compounds were purified using a silica gel column.

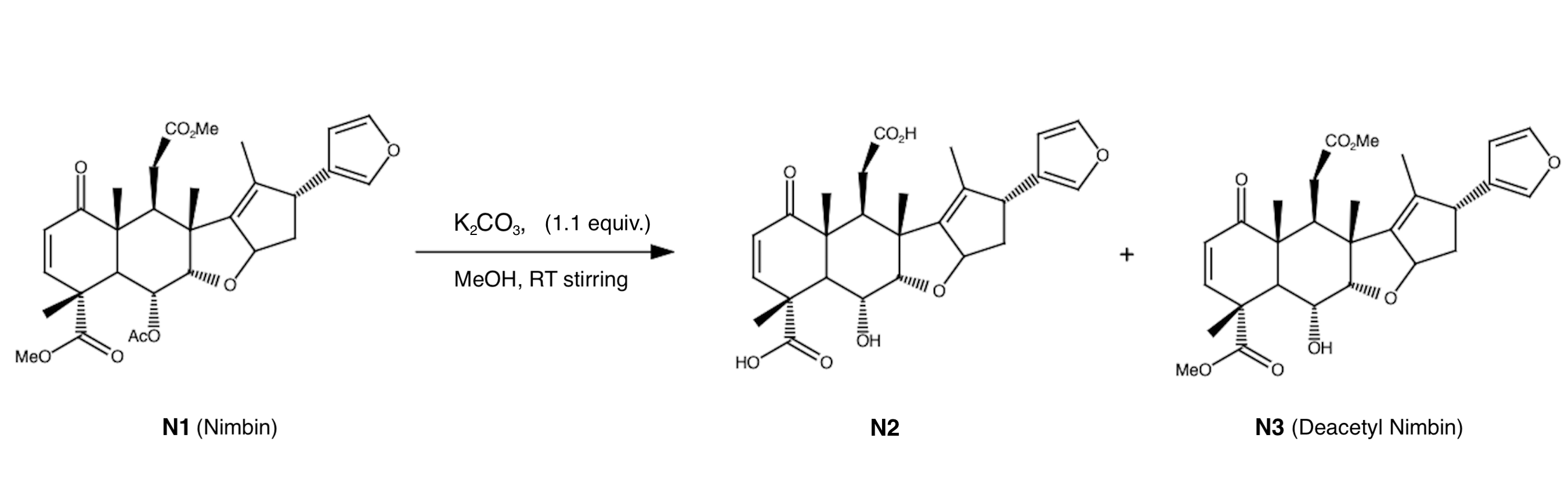
Deacetylation of nimbin N1 with potassium carbonate

The effects of mimbin were tested in cell-free and cell lines by the influence of lipopolysaccharide (LPS).

==== In-vitro: anti-inflammatory activity by membrane stabilizing ====
Human red blood cell membrane (HBRC) stabilization has been employed to evaluate the anti-inflammatory property. HBRC membrane resembles the lysosomal membrane components. Therefore, the effects of nimbin and derivatives on the stabilization of the HRBC membrane could be deduced from the stabilization of the lysosomal membrane. The reaction of nimbin was tested on hemolysis of human red blood cells induced by heat and hypotonicity.

Four experiences were performed in vitro with different concentrations of N1, N2, and N3 (25, 50, 100, and 150 μm) and then compared to diclofenac, a nonsteroidal anti-inflammatory, at 100 μm:

- Heat-induced hemolysis

- Hypotonicity-induced hemolysis

- Lipoxygenase inhibition activity

- Proteinase inhibition assay

For all the experiences, N1, N2, and N3 dose-dependently were efficient in inhibiting the hypotonicity and heat-induced hemolysis, lipoxygenase, and proteinase. Moreover, they inhibit better and more effectively with high concentration.

==== In-vivo: Estimation of ROS levels in zebrafish larvae via inflammation ====
To detect intracellular reactive oxygen species (ROS) generation by induced inflammation (LPS) in zebrafish, an oxidation-sensitive fluorescent DCF-DA sample was used. The larvae were treated with N1, N2, and N3 at different concentrations (25 and 100 μm). As a result, Zebrafish larvae treated with N1, N2, and N3 have been shown to reduce inflammation by decreased in intracellular ROS levels.

The results of the experience confirm that nimbin and its derivatives N1, N2, and N3 have an anti-inflammatory propertie and were able to decrease the ROS levels induced by LPS in both in vivo and in vitro.

=== Anti-diabetic effect ===
The neem tree has valuable properties for health and is often used in medicine as an anti-inflammatory, anti-cancer, or antioxidant. Its toxicity to mammals is very low, negligible, and not targeted to other living beings. Nimbin can be used for people with diabetes because it has an anti-diabetic effect, especially when it is modified and transformed into semi-natural molecules such as N2 (semisynthetic nimbin analog N2) or N3 (deacetylnimbin N3). This effectiveness is not verified for the N2 molecule. However, its hypoglycemic effect on β cells has been evaluated with insulin. Abnormal β cells in people with diabetes are one of the causes of the dysfunction of the insulin system. A study on zebrafish embryos has made it possible to evaluate the cytotoxic effects of nimbin molecules on the larvae of these fish. N2 then serves as an antioxidant protection against β cells and anti-hyperglycemic activity. The insulin system is then restored. This study showed that N2 had no toxic impact on these individuals health and development. But a high concentration could be dangerous if used excessively.

=== Antimicrobial ===
There are a few studies regarding the antimicrobial activity of nimbin. However, Nimbin has an antimicrobial activity only against few bacteria species. The antimicrobial effects of neem metabolites can be studied by HCL characterization. An agar diffusion test allows us to study this activity against bacteria like Bacillus cereus or Escherichia coli. These bacteria present in the soil have the property to induce in many cultivated plants a systemic resistance against various phytopathogenic agents. This is why neem is chosen to fight against these bacteria. Cultures of these bacteria in Petri dishes then cover the nutrient agar. Zones of inhibition on certain parts of the agar can be observed, characterizing nimbin's antimicrobial side. The concentration of azadirachtin in neem extracts is much important than nimbin's and salannin's and therefore it could be the most potent neem metabolite against bacteria. However, according to another study, neem's antimicrobial effect relies also heavily on the other neem metabolites (including nimbin) but more researches must be carried out on this topic.

=== Insecticide ===
Chemical structure of isonimbinolide

Nimbin is one of the insecticidally active compounds naturally present in neem. It justifies its presence in pesticidal and pharmacological products. This natural pesticide has significant potential because of the actual need for a natural pesticide to protect plants from contaminations and insects. Endophytes, whose role is to protect the tree from herbivore insects, can also produce nimbin in the neem tree.

Nimbin can be photo-oxidized under laboratory conditions to obtain nimbinolide and isonimbinolide. These products reportedly have some insecticidal effects against some pest species. Isonimbolide is more antifeedant and insecticidal than nimbin and nimbinolide. Therefore, these photo-oxidation products prevent the development of insects in neem. However, more research must be conducted to study their activity against other pest species.

=== Antifungal ===
Chemical structure of nimbinolide

Nimbin has an antifungal activity like other neem compounds. Neem oil used against phytopathogenic fungi such as Fusarium oxysporum or Sclerotinia. Against rust pathogens, neem oil is extracted at 1000 ppm cold to maintain the antifungal activity. because of the presence of its main compounds including nimbin in their purest form. A high concentration of neem oil increases the action of nimbin on fungi and thus its antifungal activity. A study showed that by mixing neem oil with n-hexane or with 90% methanol, nimbin's antifungal activity could be distinguished. Indeed, it is only observed against some phytopathogenic fungi when using the extract mixed with 90% methanol where it has a marginal inhibitory activity. However, for the extract mixed with n-hexane no activity is detected against the other fungi. Another study showed that when the oil is mixed with ethanol, neem compounds such as nimbin acted as an inhibitor on fungal colonies. This is observed when nimbin's concentration is very high, so that the fungi do not spread in the environment. Therefore, nimbin has an antifungal activity, but a certain amount of neem is needed to have a real impact on the fungi.

== See also ==
- Azadirachtin, another chemical isolated from neem that is used commercially as an insecticide
