= Azadirachta excelsa =

Conservation status
- Least Concern (IUCN 3.1)

Scientific classification
- Kingdom: Plantae
- Clade: Tracheophytes
- Clade: Angiosperms
- Clade: Eudicots
- Clade: Rosids
- Order: Sapindales
- Family: Meliaceae
- Genus: Azadirachta
- Species: A. excelsa

Binomial name
- Azadirachta excelsa (Jack) Jacobs

Synonyms
- Melia excelsa Jack; Trichilia excelsa (Jack) Spreng.

Species of tree

Azadirachta excelsa, commonly known as sentang, is a tree in the mahogany family Meliaceae. The specific epithet excelsa is from the Latin meaning 'lofty'.

== Description ==
Azadirachta excelsa grows up to 50 metres (160 ft) tall with a trunk diameter of up to 120 centimetres (50 in). Its bark is pinkish grey or pinkish brown. The sweetly scented flowers are creamy-white. Its fruits are ellipsoid, green turning yellow at maturity, up to 3 cm (1 in) long.

== Distribution and habitat ==
Azadirachta excelsa is native to Malesia and Vietnam. Its habitat is rain forests from sea level to 350 metres (1,000 ft) altitude.

== See also ==
- Azadirachta indica (neem)
