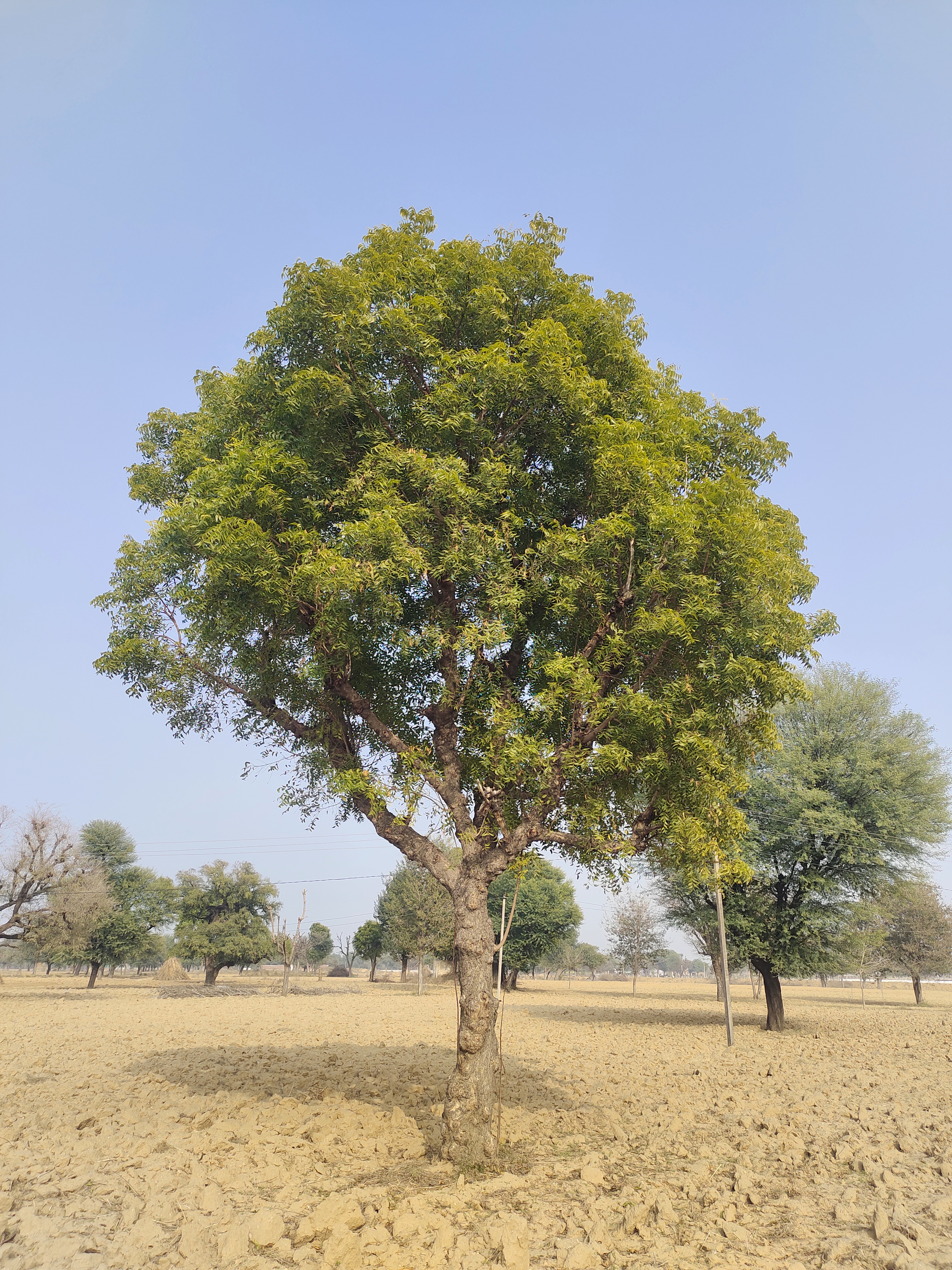
- Neem tree in Rajasthan, India

Conservation status
- Least Concern (IUCN 3.1)

Scientific classification
- Kingdom: Plantae
- Clade: Tracheophytes
- Clade: Angiosperms
- Clade: Eudicots
- Clade: Rosids
- Order: Sapindales
- Family: Meliaceae
- Genus: Azadirachta
- Species: A. indica

Binomial name
- Azadirachta indica A.Juss., 1830

Synonyms
- List: Antelaea azadirachta (L.) Adelb.; Antelaea canescens Cels ex Heynh.; Antelaea javanica Gaertn.; Azadirachta indica subsp. vartakii Kothari, Londhe & N.P.Singh; Melia azadirachta L.; Melia fraxinifolia Salisb.; Melia hasskarlii K.Koch; Melia indica (A.Juss.) Brandis; Melia japonica Hassk.; Melia parviflora Moon; Melia pinnata Stokes

= Azadirachta indica =

Species of plant

Azadirachta indica, commonly known as neem, margosa, nimtree or Indian lilac, is a tree in the mahogany family Meliaceae. It is one of the two species in the genus Azadirachta. It is native to the Indian subcontinent and to parts of Southeast Asia, but is naturalized and grown around the world in tropical and subtropical areas. Its fruits and seeds are the source of neem oil. Nim is a Hindustani noun derived from Sanskrit nimba (निंब).

== Description ==
The neem tree is a fast-growing tree that can reach a height of 15–20 metres (49–66 ft), and rarely 35–40 m (115–131 ft). It is evergreen, shedding many of its leaves during the dry winter months. The branches are wide and spreading. The fairly dense crown is roundish and may reach a diameter of 20–25 m (66–82 ft). The opposite, pinnate leaves are 20–40 cm (8–16 in) long, with 20 to 30 medium to dark green leaflets about 3–8 cm (1 1/4–3 1/4 in) long. The terminal leaflet often is missing. The petioles are short.

White and fragrant flowers are arranged in more-or-less drooping axillary panicles which are up to 25 cm (10 in) long. The inflorescences, which branch up to the third degree, bear from 250 to 300 flowers. An individual flower is 5–6 mm (3/16–1/4 in) long and 8–11 mm (5/16–7/16 in) wide. Protandrous, bisexual flowers and male flowers exist on the same individual tree.

The fruit is a smooth (glabrous), olive-like drupe which varies in shape from elongate oval to nearly roundish, and when ripe is 14–28 mm (1/2–1 1/8 in) by 10–15 mm (3/8–5/8 in). The fruit skin (exocarp) is thin and the bitter-sweet pulp (mesocarp) is yellowish-white and very fibrous. The mesocarp is 3–5 mm (1/8–1/4 in) thick. The white, hard inner shell (endocarp) of the fruit encloses one, rarely two, or three, elongated seeds (kernels) having a brown seed coat.

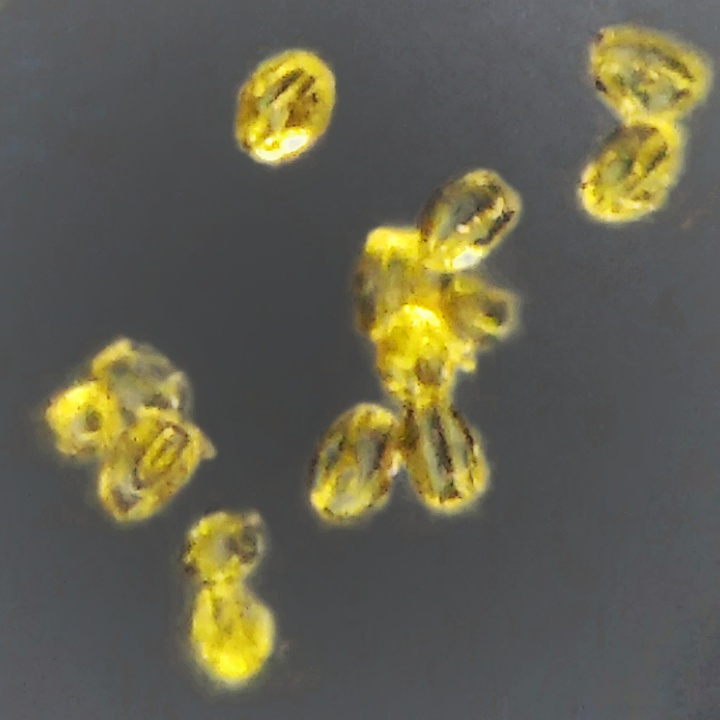
Pollen grains

The neem tree is similar in appearance to its relative, the chinaberry or bakain, Melia azedarach, with which it may be confused. Melia azedarach also has toothed leaflets and similar looking fruit. One difference is that neem leaves are pinnate but chinaberry leaves are twice- and thrice-pinnate.

== Taxonomy ==
The name Azadirachta indica was first published by Adrien-Henri de Jussieu in 1830. In 1753, Carl Linnaeus had described two species, Melia azedarach and Melia azadirachta. De Jussieu considered Melia azadirachta to be sufficiently different from Melia azedarach to be placed in a new genus. For both his species, Linnaeus referred to the name 'azedarach', which is derived from the French 'azédarac', which in turn is from the Persian 'āzād dirakht' (ازادرخت), meaning 'free or noble tree'. The Persian name of the tree, azad darakhat-e-hind, meaning 'the free tree of India', implies that it is free from disease and insect problems.

== Distribution ==
Azadirachta indica is considered to be native to the Assam region, Pakistan and Bangladesh in the Indian subcontinent and to Cambodia, Laos, Myanmar, Thailand and Vietnam in Indochina. It has been widely introduced elsewhere in tropical and subtropical regions, from South America, West Africa to Indonesia.

== Ecology ==
The neem tree is noted for its drought resistance. Normally, it thrives in areas with sub-arid to sub-humid conditions, with an annual rainfall of 400–1,200 mm (16–47 in). It can grow in regions with an annual rainfall below 400 mm, but in such cases it depends largely on ground water levels. Margosa can grow in many different types of soil, but it thrives best on well-drained deep and sandy soils. It is a typical tropical to subtropical tree and exists at annual mean temperatures of 21–32 °C (70–90 °F). It can tolerate high to very high temperatures and does not tolerate temperature below 5 °C (41 °F). Neem is one of very few shade-giving trees that thrive in drought-prone areas such as the dry coastal, southern districts of India and Pakistan. The trees are not at all delicate about water quality and thrive on the merest trickle of water, whatever the quality. In India and tropical countries where the Indian diaspora has reached, it is very common to see neem trees used for shade lining streets, around temples, schools and other such public buildings or in most people's backyards. In very dry areas, the trees are planted on large tracts of land.

=== Weed status ===
Neem is considered a weed in many areas, including some parts of the Middle East, most of Sub-Saharan Africa including West Africa and Indian Ocean states, and some parts of Australia. Its weed potential has not been fully assessed.

In April 2015, A. indica was declared a class B and C weed in the Northern Territory, Australia, meaning its growth and spread must be controlled and plants or propagules are not allowed to be brought into the territory. It is illegal to buy, sell, or transport the plants or seeds. Its declaration as a weed came in response to its invasion of waterways in the "Top End" of the territory.

After being introduced into Australia, possibly in the 1940s, A. indica was originally planted in the Northern Territory to provide shade for cattle. Trial plantations were established between the 1960s and 1980s in Darwin, Queensland, and Western Australia, but the Australian neem industry did not prove viable. The tree has now spread into the savanna, particularly around waterways, and naturalised populations exist in several areas.

== Phytochemicals ==
Neem fruit, seeds, leaves, stems, and bark contain diverse phytochemicals, some of which were first discovered in azadirachta seed extracts, such as azadirachtin established in the 1960s as an insect antifeedant, growth disruptor, and insecticide. The yield of azadirachtin from crushing 2 kg of seeds is about 5 g.

The Neem tree had more than 135 compounds isolated from it and the importance of Neem tree has been recognised by the US National Academy of Sciences.

In addition to the triterpenoid azadirachtin and related limonoids, the seed oil contains glycerides, diverse polyphenols, nimbolide, triterpenes, and beta-sitosterol. The yellow, bitter oil has a garlic-like odor and contains about 2% of limonoid compounds. The leaves contain quercetin, catechins, carotenes, and vitamin C.

== Uses ==
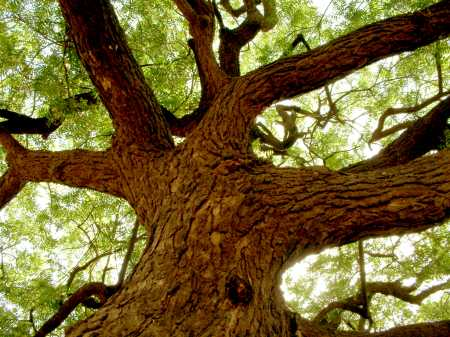
Trunk of a large tree

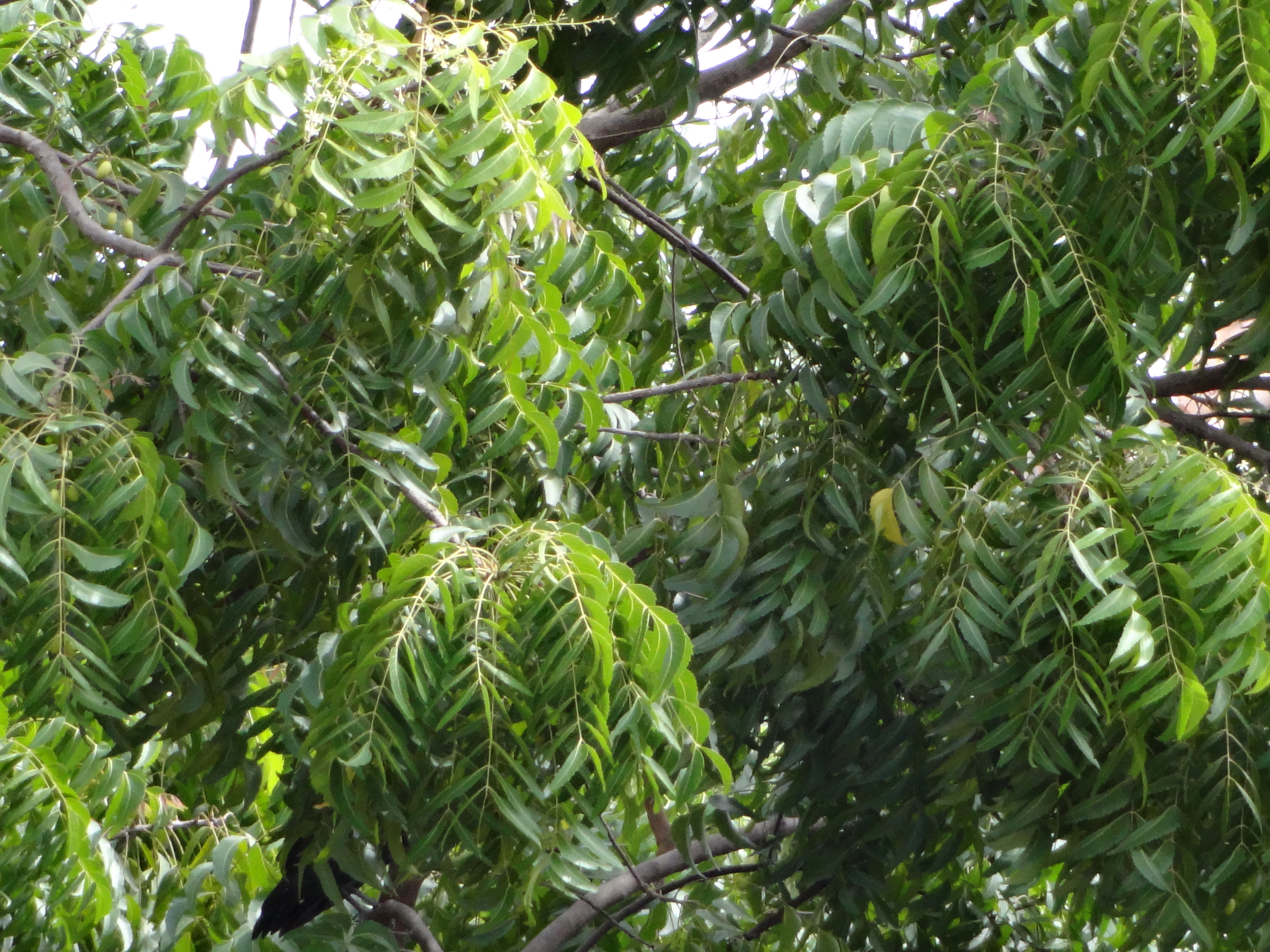
Leaves

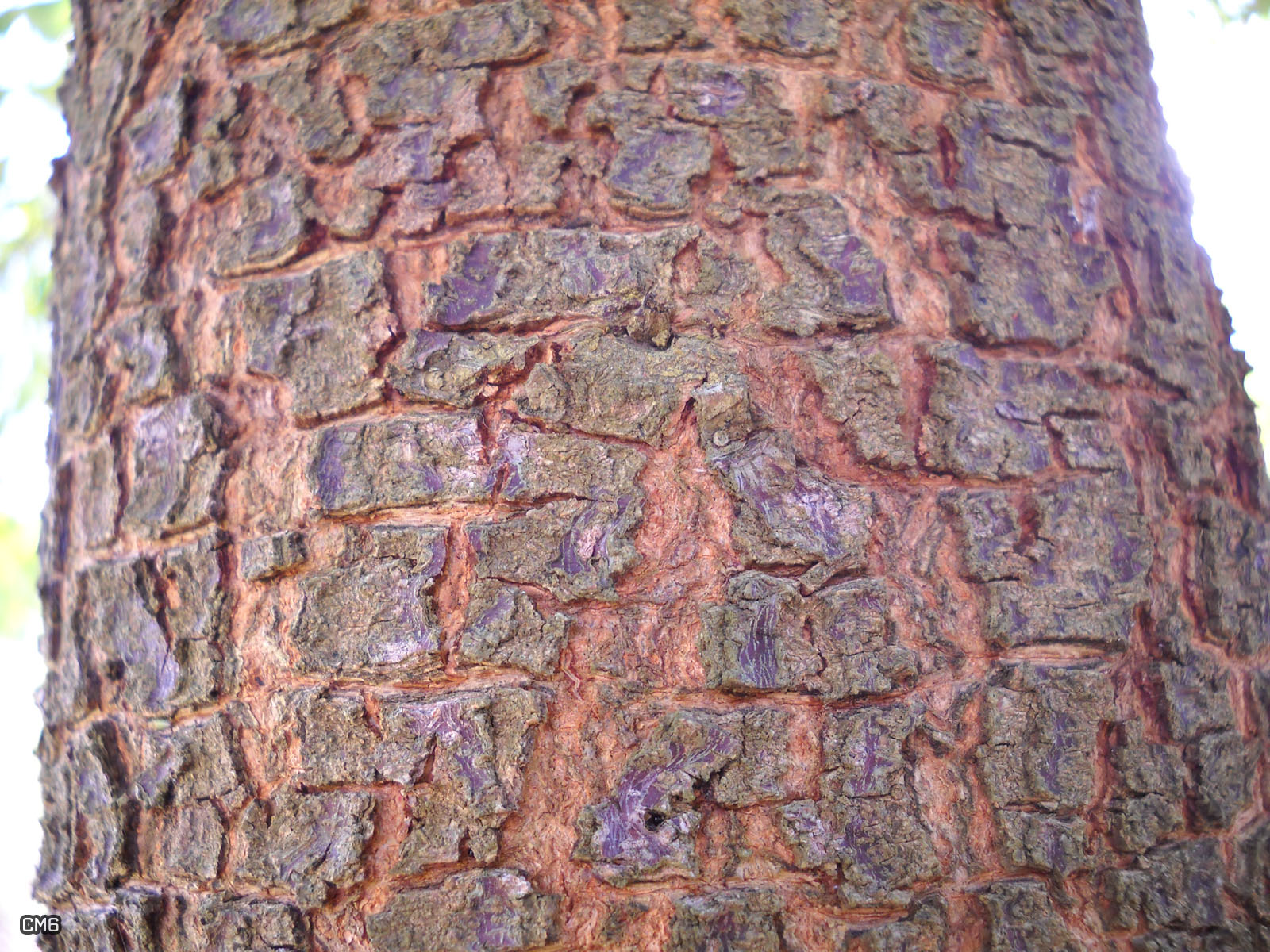
Bark

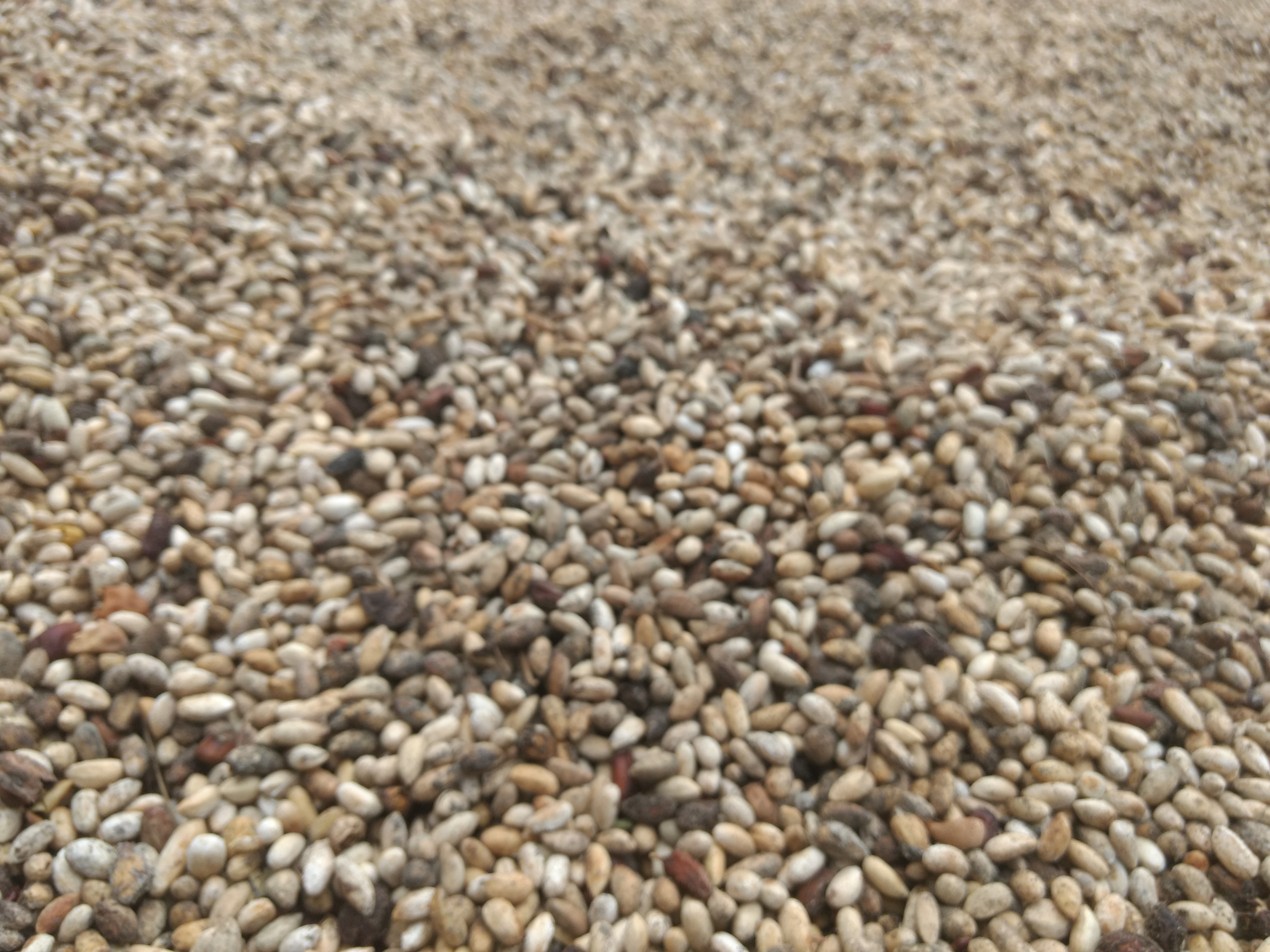
Neem seeds

Neem leaves are dried in India and placed in cupboards to prevent insects from eating clothes, and in containers in which rice and wheat are stored. The flowers are also used in many Indian festivals like Ugadi. See below: #Association with Hindu festivals in India.

=== Culinary ===
The tender shoots and flowers of the neem tree are eaten as a vegetable in India. A soup-like dish called vēppam pū cāṟu (வேப்பம் பூ சாறு) in Tamil (translated as "margosa flower rasam") made of the flower of neem is prepared in Tamil Nadu. In Bengal, young neem leaves are fried in oil with tiny pieces of aubergine (brinjal). The dish is called nim bēgun bhājā (নিম বেগুন ভাজা) and is the first item during a Bengali meal, which acts as an appetizer. It is eaten with rice.

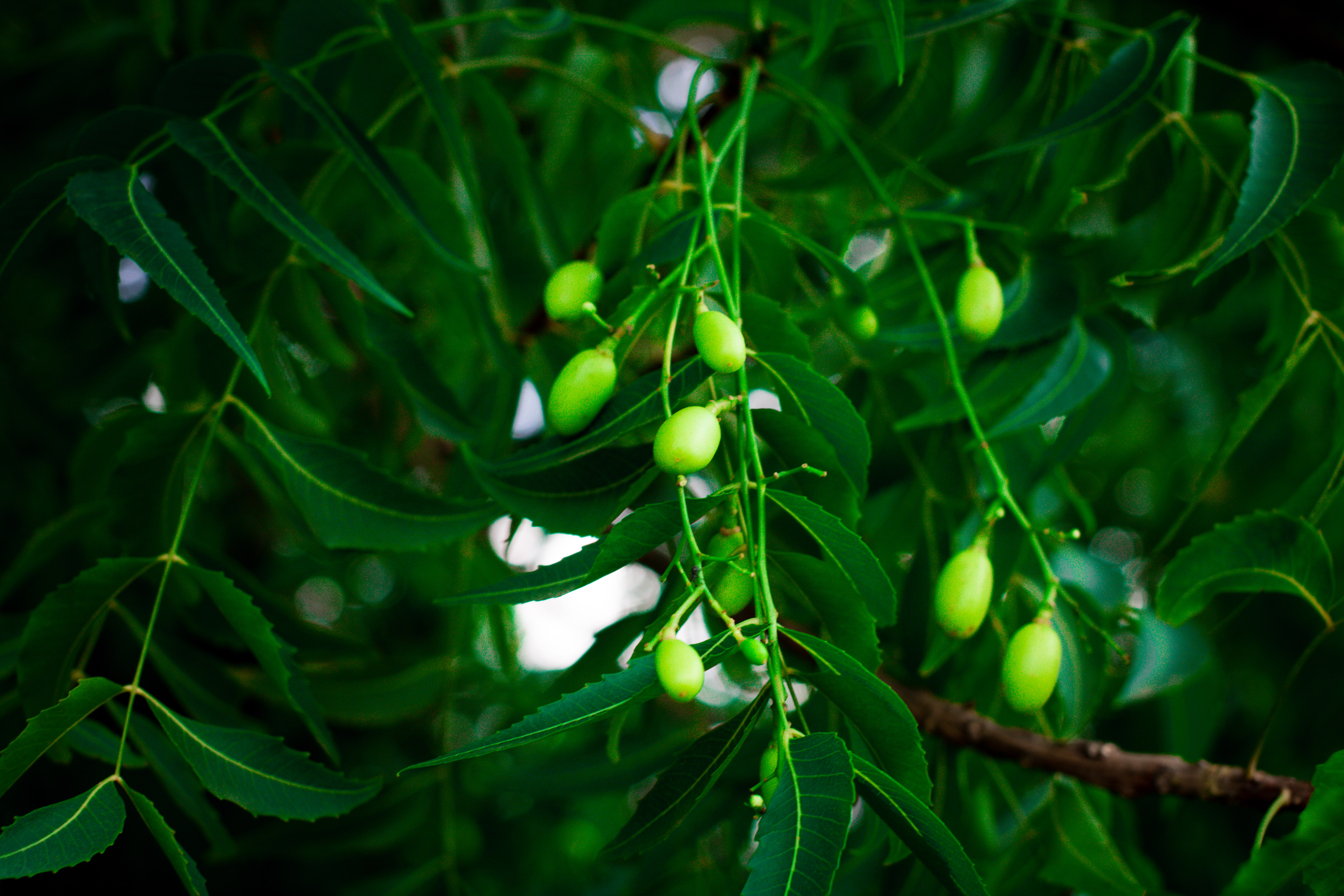
Neem leaves and fruits

Neem is used in parts of mainland Southeast Asia, particularly in Cambodia, Laos (where it is called kadao [ກະເດົາ]), Thailand (where it is known as sadao [สะเดา [sàʔ daw] or satao สะเตา [sàʔ taw]]), Myanmar (where it is known as ta.ma [တမာ]) and Vietnam (where it is known as sầu đâu and is used to cook the salad gỏi sầu đâu). Even if lightly cooked, the flavour is quite bitter, and the food is not consumed by all inhabitants of these countries. In Myanmar, young neem leaves and flower buds are boiled with tamarind fruit to soften its bitterness and eaten as a vegetable. Pickled neem leaves are also eaten with tomato and fish paste sauce in Myanmar.

=== Traditional medicine ===
Products made from neem trees have been used in the traditional medicine of India for centuries, but there is insufficient clinical evidence to indicate any benefits of using neem for medicinal purposes.

In small children, neem oil is toxic and can lead to death. Neem may also cause miscarriages, infertility, and low blood sugar.

In Southern India and the Middle East, neem twigs are often used as a teeth-cleaning twig.

=== Pest and disease control ===
Neem is used as an insecticide, providing a natural alternative to synthetic pesticides. The active ingredient is azadirachtin. Neem seeds are ground into powder that is soaked overnight in water and sprayed on the crop. To be effective, it must be applied repeatedly, at least every ten days. In addition to directly killing insects, neem acts as an anti-feedant, repellent, and egg-laying deterrent and thus protects the crop from damage. The insects starve and die within a few days. Neem also suppresses the subsequent hatching of their eggs. Neem-based fertilizers have been effective against southern armyworm. Neem cake may be used as a fertilizer. Silver nanoparticles made from the bark and leaves of A. indica were also highly effective at killing first- and fourth-stage Culex quinquefasciatus mosquito larvae, but they worked less well against the pupae and adult mosquitoes.

=== Neem gum ===
Neem gum is a natural resin extracted from the Neem tree, and is used as a bulking agent and for pharmaceutical applications, including as a tablet binder, slow-release agent, and film coating. It is also used in silk dyeing.

=== Other uses ===
- Tree: the neem tree is of great importance for its anti-desertification properties and possibly as a good carbon dioxide sink. It is also used for maintaining soil fertility.
- Fertilizer: neem extract is added to fertilizers (urea) as a nitrification inhibitor.
- Animal feed: Neem leaves can be occasionally used as forage for ruminants and rabbits.
- Teeth cleaning: neem has traditionally been used as a type of teeth-cleaning twig.

== Genome and transcriptomes ==
The neem genome and transcriptomes from various organs have been sequenced. Expressed sequence tags were identified by generation of subtractive hybridization libraries of neem fruit, leaf, fruit mesocarp, and fruit endocarp.

== Cultural and social impact ==
Neem tree decorated with lighting during festive season in India

=== In Hinduism ===
In the various parts of India, the Neem tree is revered and is believed to be the dwelling place of deities related to disease. The Sanskrit name for Neem Tree is arishtha (meaning "reliever of sickness"). All the different parts of a Neem tree, including roots, leaves, wood, flower, and fruit are utilised to alleviate physical and mental sicknesses.

Hindus believe the Neem tree is an embodiment of Shakti. In the villages of Tamil Nadu, women dress the Neem tree in a Sari and treat it as "the mother". At some of the temples, the Neem tree is planted along with a Peepal tree, representing the female and male deities respectively, and are married with eachother. In Uttarakhand, the Mansa Devi Temple, dedicated to the worship of the goddess Manasa (a form of Shakti), has Peepal and Neem trees grown in the temple vicinity as they are considered more powerful trees.

The name Nimai ('born under a neem tree'), of the Bhakti movement Vaishnava saint Chaitanya Mahaprabhu (believed to be an incarnation of Radha Krishna in Gaudiya Vaishnavism and ISKCON) is due to his birth under a neem tree.

=== Patents and recognition ===
In 1995, the European Patent Office (EPO) granted a patent on an anti-fungal product derived from neem to the United States Department of Agriculture and W. R. Grace and Company. The Indian government challenged the patent when it was granted, claiming that the process for which the patent had been granted had been in use in India for more than 2,000 years. In 2000, the EPO ruled in India's favour, but W. R. Grace appealed, claiming that prior art about the product had never been published. On 8 March 2005, that appeal was lost and the EPO revoked the Neem patent.

== Biotechnology ==
The biopesticide produced by extraction from the tree seeds contains limonoid triterpenes. Currently, the extraction process has disadvantages, such as contamination with fungi and heterogeneity in the content of limonoids due to genetic, climatic, and geographical variations. To overcome these problems, production of limonoids from plant cell suspension and hairy root cultures in bioreactors has been studied, including the development of a two-stage bioreactor process that enhances growth and production of limonoids with cell suspension cultures of A. indica.

== Gallery ==
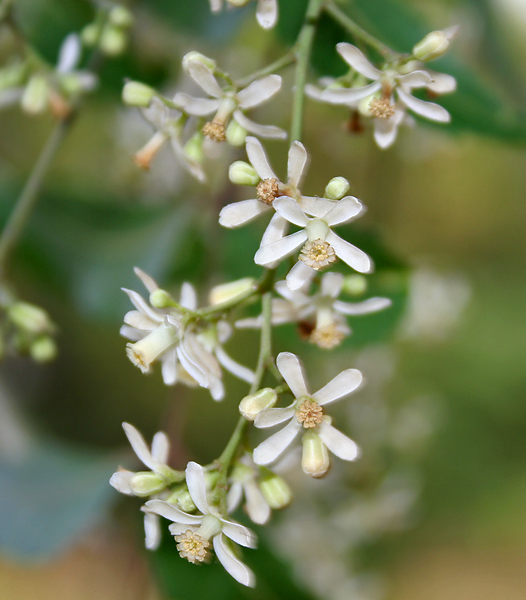
Flowers

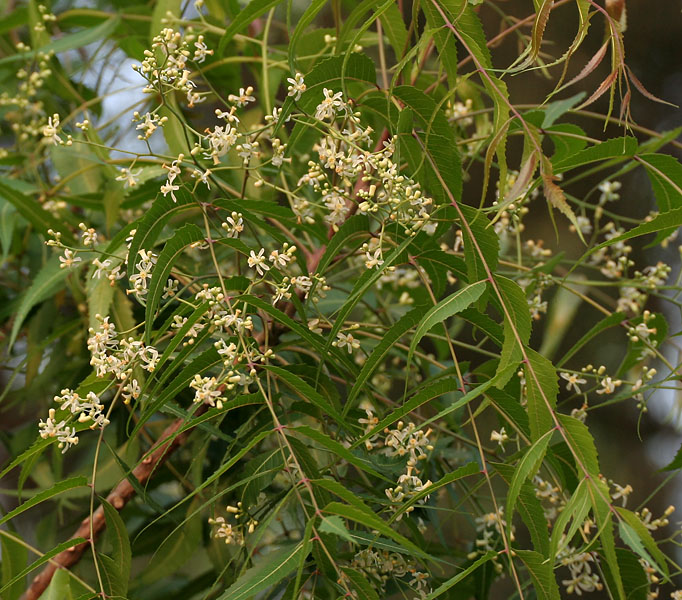
Leaves and flowers

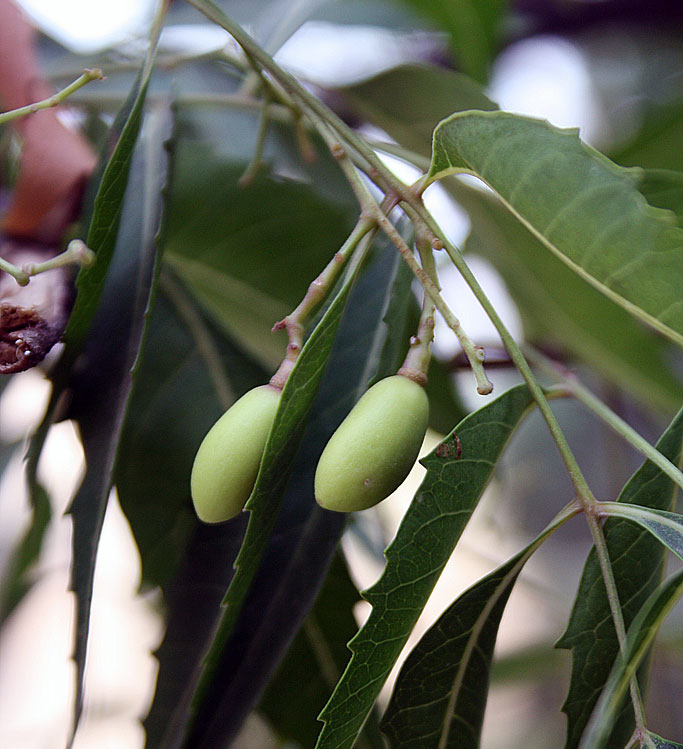
Unripe fruit

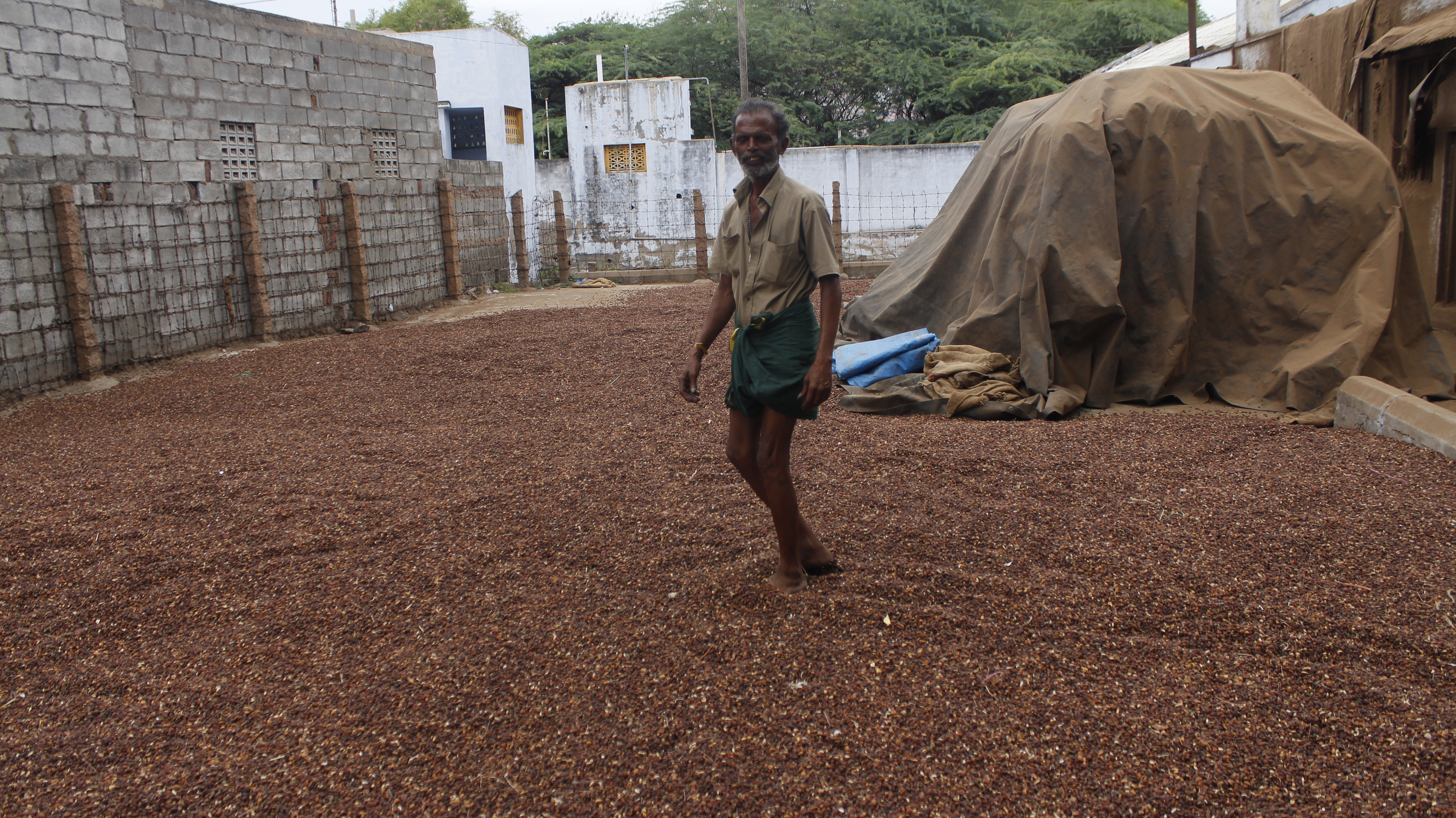
Fruit drying for oil extraction

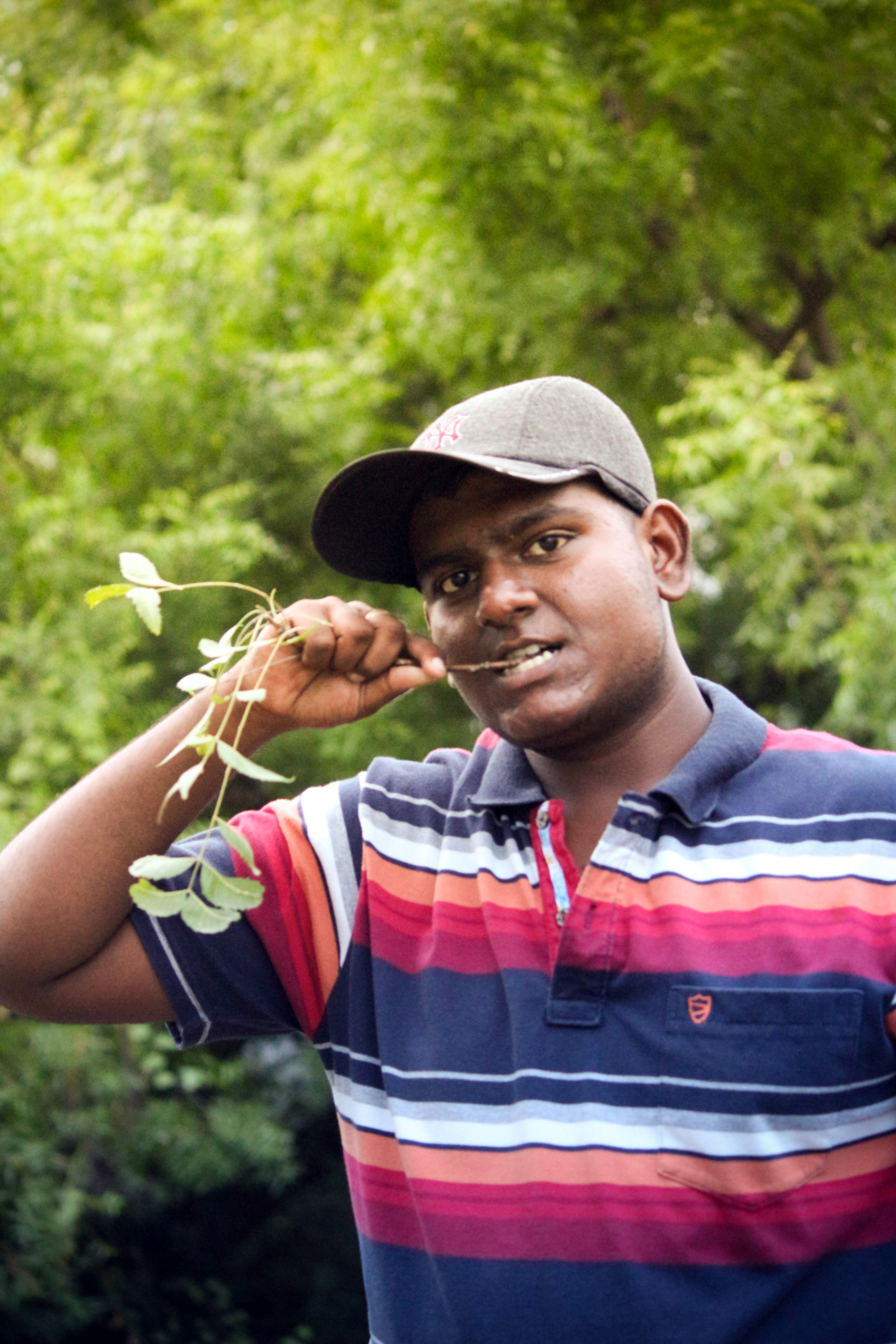
Cleaning teeth by chewing stick

== See also ==
- Arid Forest Research Institute (AFRI)
- Ayurveda
- Azadirachta excelsa (sentang)
- Azadirachtin
- Babool (brand) of toothpaste
- Neem cake
- Neem oil
- Teeth cleaning twig (datun)
