= Antifeedant =

Compounds produced by plants to stop insects feeding on them

Antifeedants are chemicals produced by plants (phytochemicals) which repel insects through distaste. Alternative names for antifeedants are antifeeding compounds, feeding deterrents, feeding rejectants, feeding suppressants, feeding inhibitors, gustatory repellents, phagodepressants, anorexigenics, and anti-appetants.

== Definition ==
Antifeedants are most generally defined as chemicals that act at low concentrations and are perceived by specialized taste receptors (gustatory receptors). Other definitions, both narrower and broader appear in the literature.

A chemical that repels insects through smell rather than taste, acting on the insect's smell receptors (olfactory receptors), is defined as a repellent and is not usually characterised as an antifeedant. Insecticidal compounds produced by plants will obviously stop an insect from feeding, but these are not classified as antifeedants. It is, however, possible that a chemical may act as an antifeedant against one species and as an insecticide against another (see azadirachtin).

The production of antifeedants is one of several mechanisms plants use to stop herbivores from eating them.

Not all plants produce antifeedants. Since they are not essential for the life of a plant, they are classed as secondary metabolites.

Antifeedants are signaling molecules (semiochemicals). Since they are advantageous to the producing organism (plant) to the detriment of another organism (insect), they are classed as allomones.

== Biochemical mode of action ==
Insects have sweet, bitter, sour, salty, and umami taste (gustatory) receptors, as do humans. In general, compounds that are sweet or bitter to a human are sweet or bitter to insects. Antifeedants may activate a receptor (e.g., bitter receptor), causing distaste, or may block a receptor which would stimulate feeding (e.g., sweet receptor), causing the insect to look elsewhere for a suitable food source. Many antifeedants are bitter.

Insects have gustatory receptors on various parts of the body, not only on the mouth parts. Some can taste with their feet (tarsi). An insect moving away after detecting an antifeedant with its tarsi and without biting into the plant is sometimes referred to as an irritant mechanism or a suppressant.

Insects can become habituated to antifeedants and can even evolve over generations to use ‘repellents’ to identify plants for consumption.

== Chemical types ==
Koul lists about 900 compounds with antifeedant activity. Antifeedants can be found among all the major classes of secondary metabolites. However, the most potent antifeedants are terpenoids. This is also the group with the greatest number and diversity of known antifeedants. Amongst terpenoids, limonoids are well studied, and the most potent example is azadirachtin A.

== Agricultural use ==
The only antifeedant used commercially is azadirachtin containing extracts from the neem tree, Azadirachta indica, although the insecticidal activity is more relevant than the antifeedant activity. It is a biopesticide approved for use in organic farming.

Limonoids such as limonin are antifeedants produced by a number of plants of the families Cucurbitaceae Rutaceae and Meliaceae.

Common plants known as sources of antifeedants

Green garlic, which releases allicin upon cutting

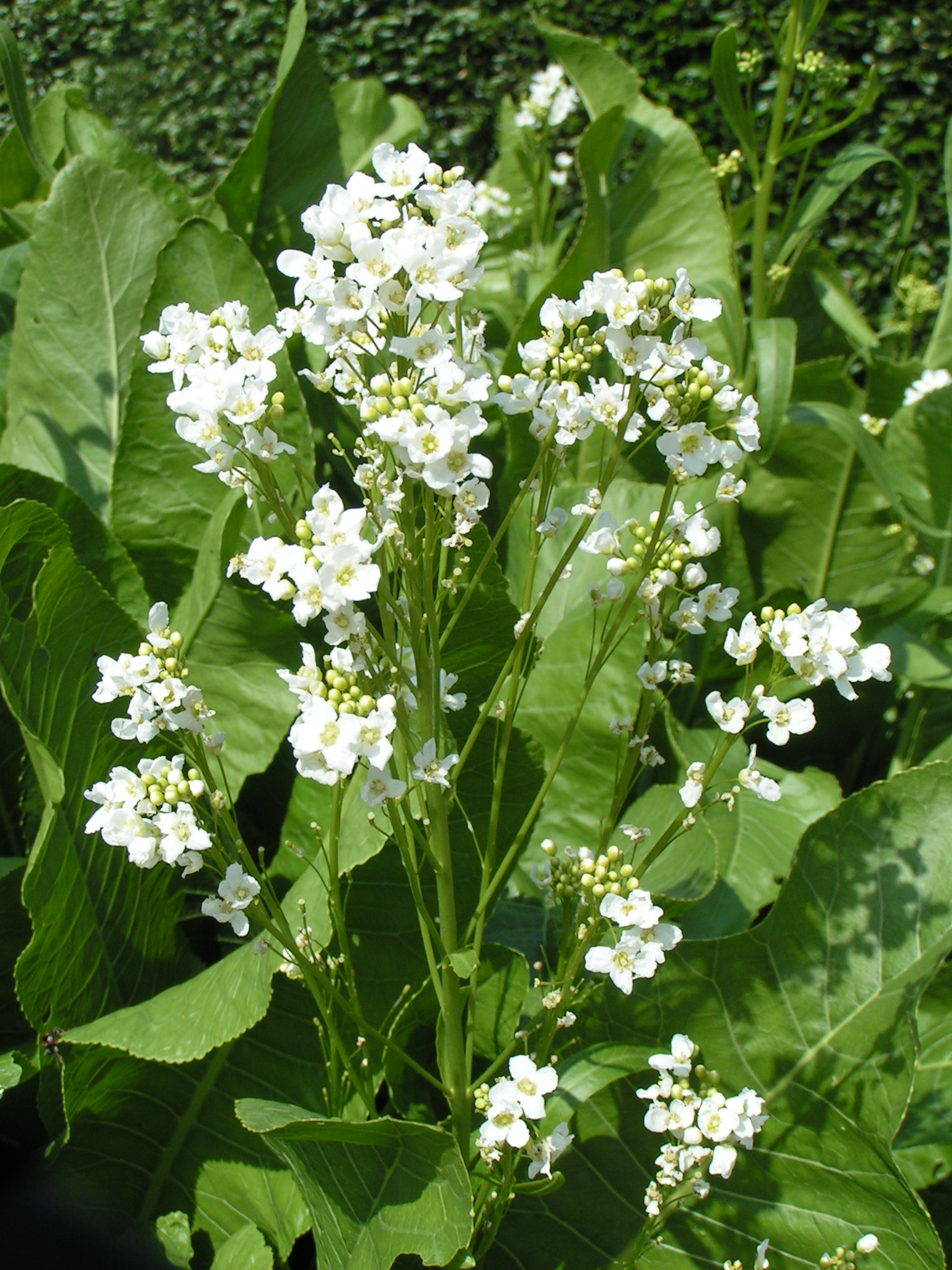
horseradish plants, which release allyl isothiocyanate upon cutting
