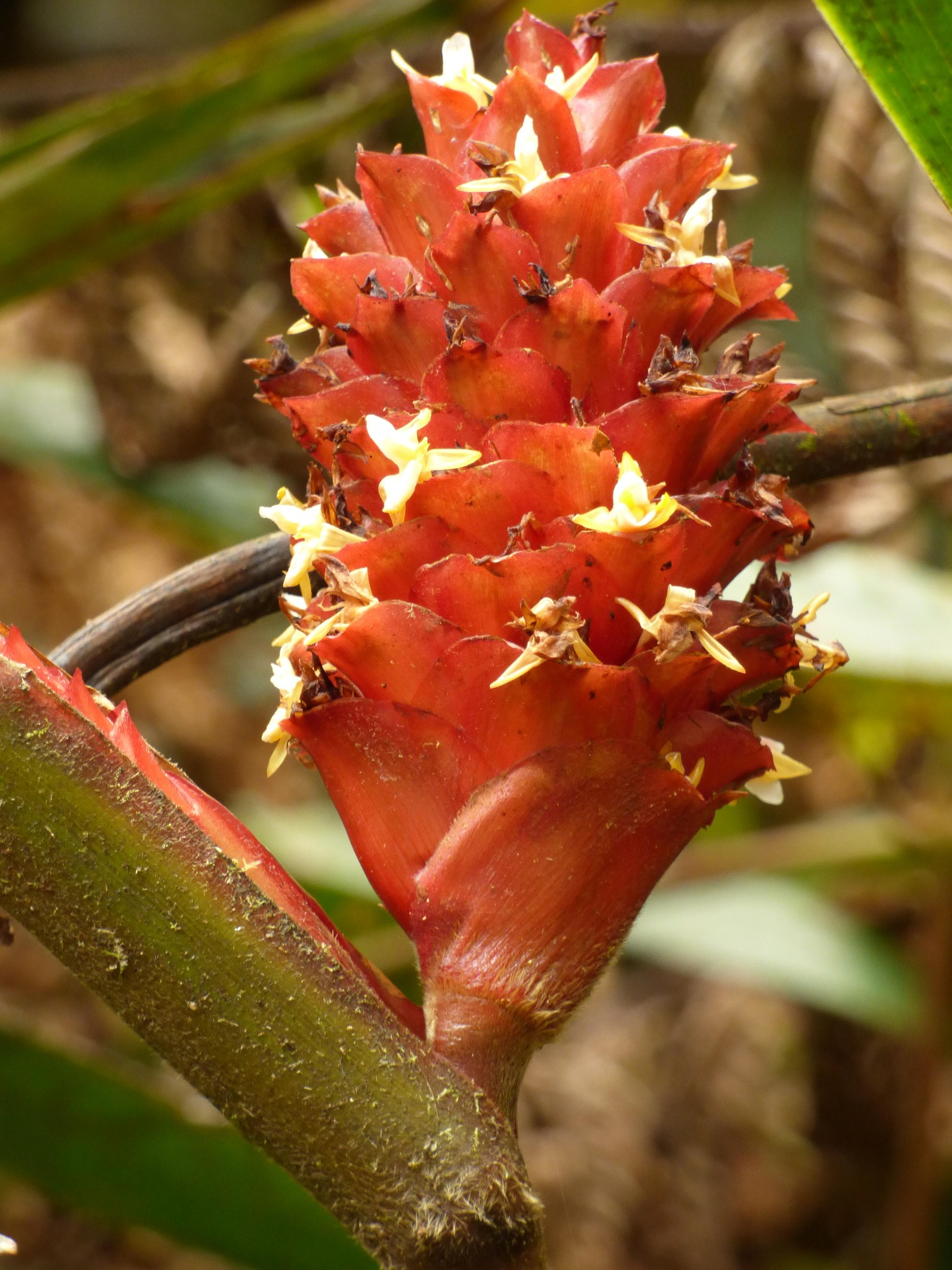

Scientific classification
- Kingdom: Plantae
- Clade: Embryophytes
- Clade: Tracheophytes
- Clade: Angiosperms
- Clade: Monocots
- Clade: Commelinids
- Order: Zingiberales
- Family: Marantaceae
- Genus: Calathea
- Species: C. timothei

Binomial name
- Calathea timothei H.Kenn.

= Calathea timothei =

Species of plant

Calathea timothei is a species of plant in the family Marantaceae. It is native to Colombia and Ecuador.

== Description ==
Calathea timothei is a tall plant (around 2 to 3 meters) with longs, huge, glossy green leaves with green and red petioles and a green red long pulvinus. The vein on the underside of the leaves is bright red. The inflorescence of Calathea timothei is made of multiple bracts spirally arranged around a very short, red peduncle. The inflorescence is usually emerging from a node of a cauline leaf. The bracts are of an intense red and the flowers are small and yellow.

It is a species which inflorescence differs from the usual distichious bracts like Calathea crotalifera. Similar species that share a similar inflorescence in the genus are Calathea asplundii, Calathea confusa, Calathea croatii and Calathea guzmanioides.
