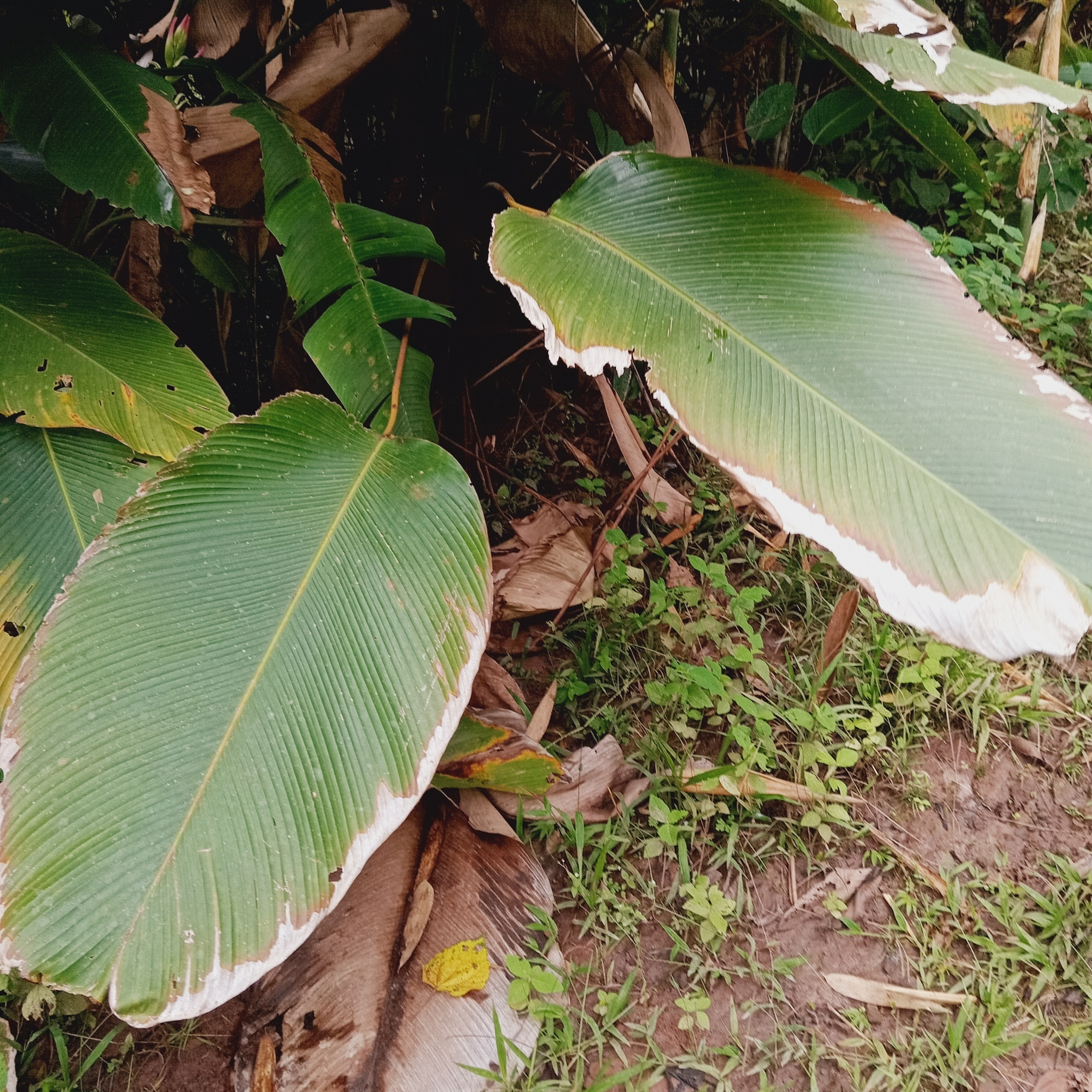

Scientific classification
- Kingdom: Plantae
- Clade: Embryophytes
- Clade: Tracheophytes
- Clade: Spermatophytes
- Clade: Angiosperms
- Clade: Monocots
- Clade: Commelinids
- Order: Zingiberales
- Family: Marantaceae
- Genus: Calathea
- Species: C. lateralis

Binomial name
- Calathea lateralis (Ruiz & Pav.) Lindl.

Synonyms
- Maranta lateralis Ruiz & Pav.; Phrynium laterale (Ruiz & Pav.) Poepp. & Endl.; Phyllodes lateralis (Ruiz & Pav.) Kuntze; Calathea nodosa Rusby

= Calathea lateralis =

Species of plant

Calathea lateralis is a species of plant from the genus Calathea in the Marantaceae family. It is native to Bolivia, Brazil North, Colombia, Ecuador, Panamá and Peru.

== Description ==
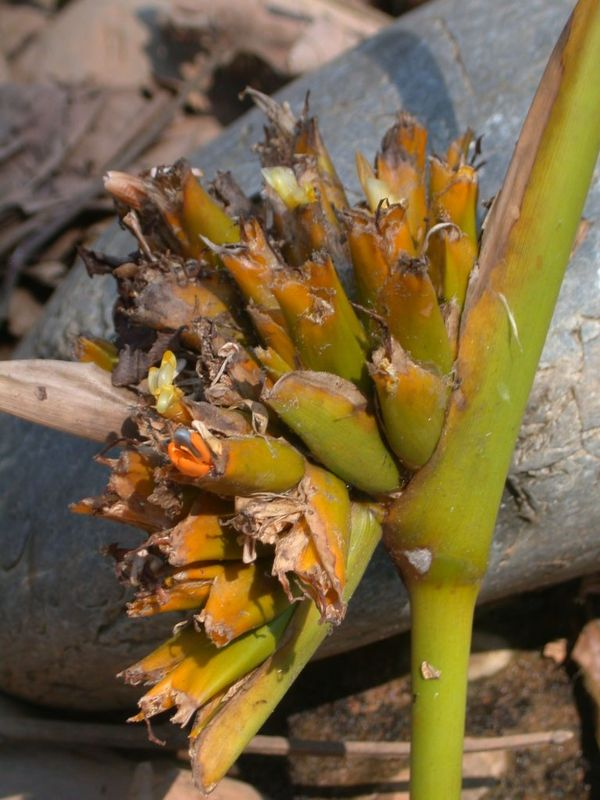
Inflorescence of Calathea lateralis

Calathea lateralis is a tall plant (around 2 to 4 meters when mature), with huge, ovale, matte green leaves, with green reddish thick petioles and a long pulvinus. The middle vein above the leaf is yellow. This species is a part of the plants in the genus that have a cluster of inflorescence directly emerging from the node of the cauline leaf, as opposed of usual Calathea which have a single inflorescence set on a lengthy peduncle. The bracts are usually green with orange tips, but can sometimes be intense orange and even dark red due to conditions. The flowers are similar to those of Calathea lutea, with purple (or sometimes yellow) petals and yellow staminodes.
