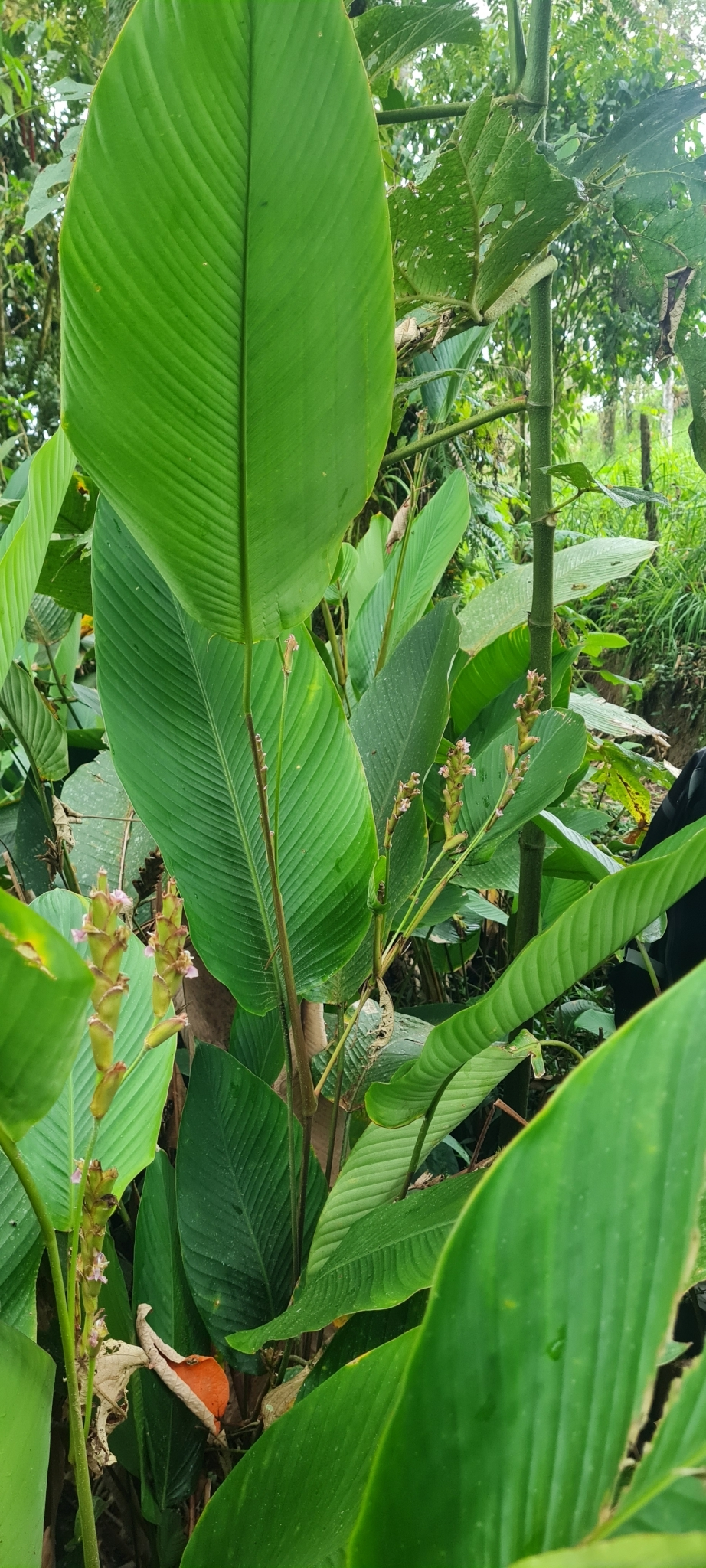

Conservation status
- Endangered (IUCN 3.1)

Scientific classification
- Kingdom: Plantae
- Clade: Embryophytes
- Clade: Tracheophytes
- Clade: Spermatophytes
- Clade: Angiosperms
- Clade: Monocots
- Clade: Commelinids
- Order: Zingiberales
- Family: Marantaceae
- Genus: Calathea
- Species: C. ischnosiphonoides

Binomial name
- Calathea ischnosiphonoides H.Kenn.

= Calathea ischnosiphonoides =

Species of flowering plant

Calathea ischnosiphonoides is a species of plant from the genus Calathea in the Marantaceae family. It is endemic to Ecuador. Its natural habitat is subtropical or tropical moist montane forests.

== Description ==
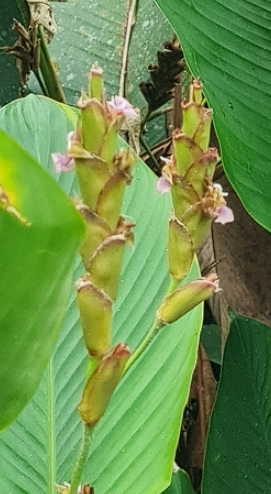
Inflorescence of Calathea ischnosiphonoides

Calathea ischnosiphonoides is a tall plant (around 2 to 3 meters when mature) with huge, ovale, long green leaves, with long, thick green petioles and a long pulvinus. The inflorescence of Calathea ischnosiphonoides is made of multiple distichious bracts around a thin green peduncle. The bracts are green with a thin brown line at the tip. The flowers are small and pink.
