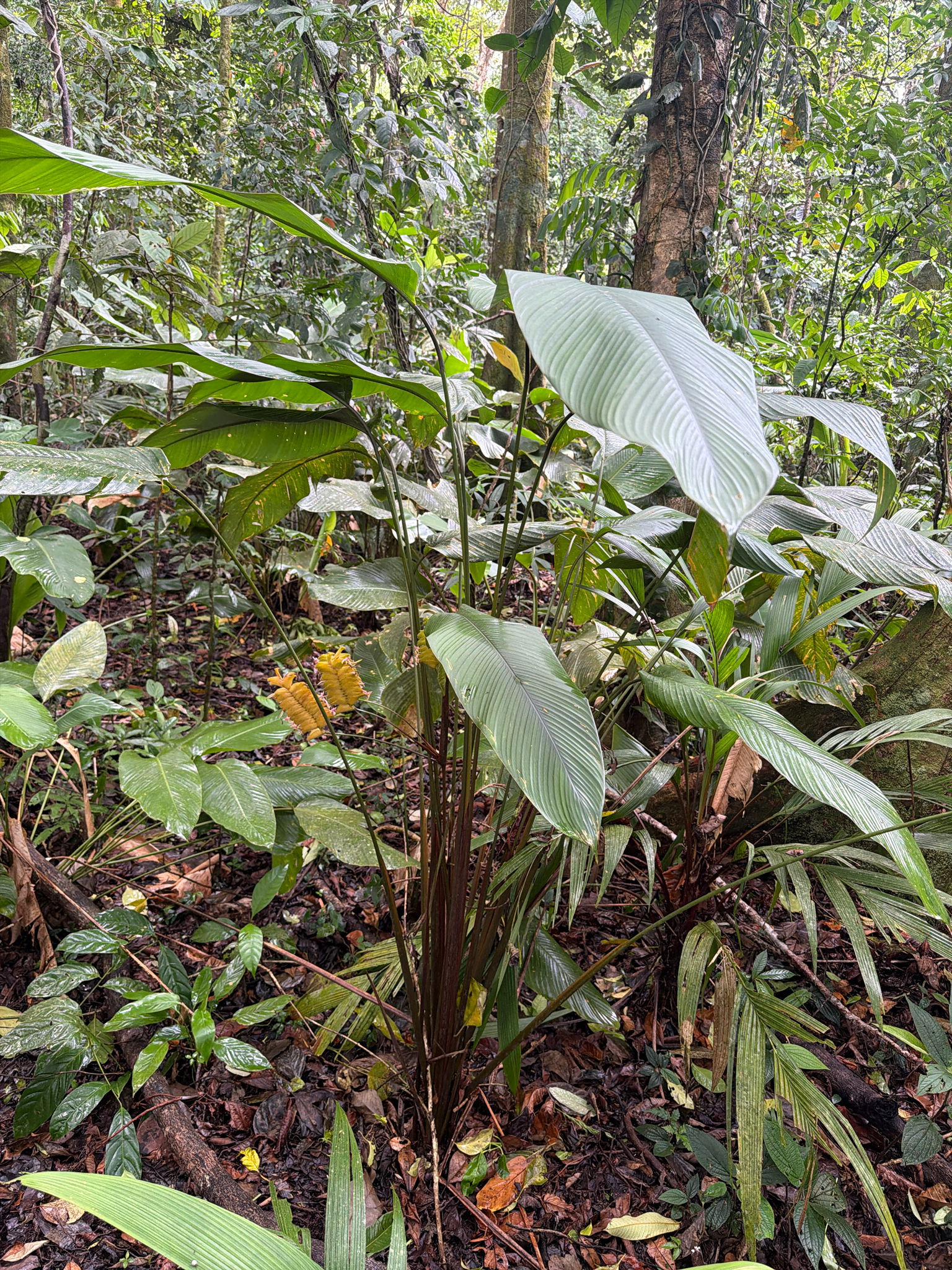

Scientific classification
- Kingdom: Plantae
- Clade: Embryophytes
- Clade: Tracheophytes
- Clade: Spermatophytes
- Clade: Angiosperms
- Clade: Monocots
- Clade: Commelinids
- Order: Zingiberales
- Family: Marantaceae
- Genus: Calathea
- Species: C. lasiostachya

Binomial name
- Calathea lasiostachya Donn.Sm.

Synonyms
- Calathea lasiostachya var. minor Cufod.

= Calathea lasiostachya =

Species of plant

Calathea lasiostachya is a species of plant from the genus Calathea in the Marantaceae family. It is native to Costa Rica, Nicaragua and Panamá.

== Description ==
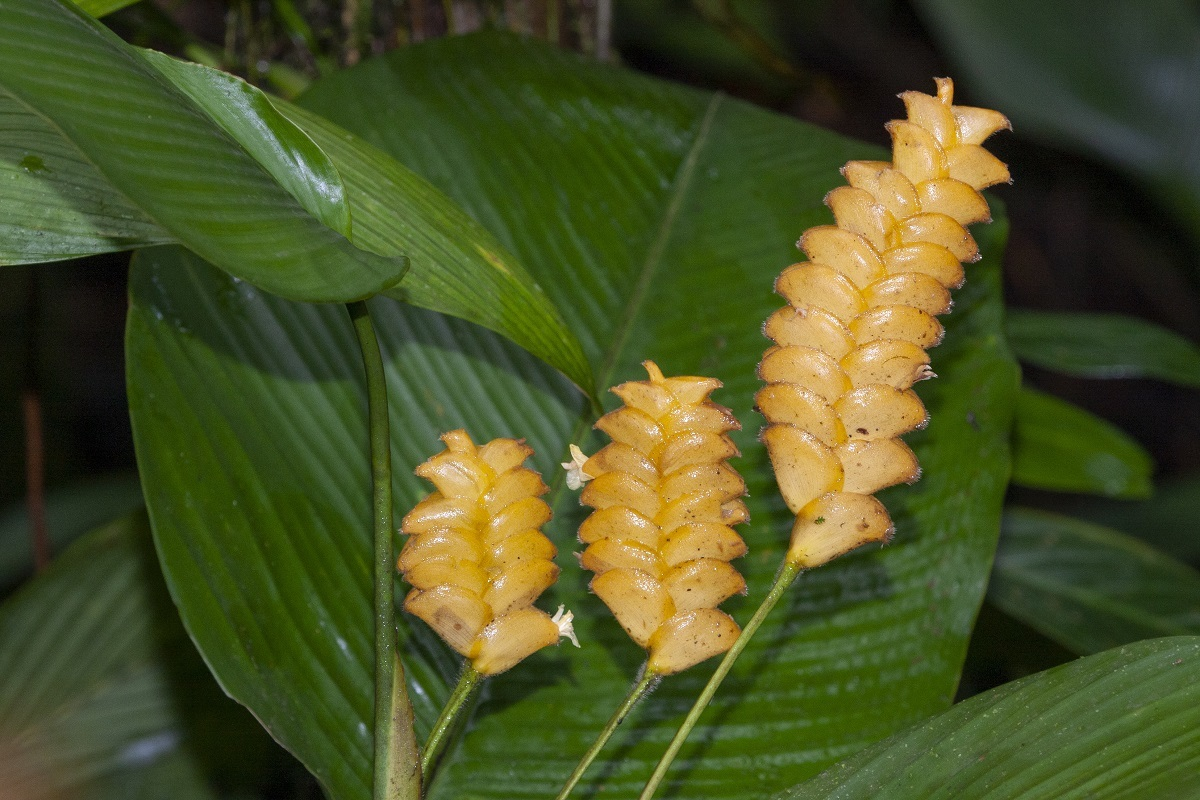
Inflorescence of Calathea lasiostachya

Calathea lasiostachya is a tall plant (around 1 to 3 meters when mature) with very long green leaves, long petioles and a long pulvinus. The inflorescence of C.lasiostachya is extremely similar to Calathea crotalifera, which makes it often easily confused. The bracts of C.lasiostachya are green to yellow and hairy, compared to C.crotalifera which has no hair on the bracts. The flowers are small with green petals and pink staminodes. Usually, multiple inflorescence come from the same cauline leaf's node.
