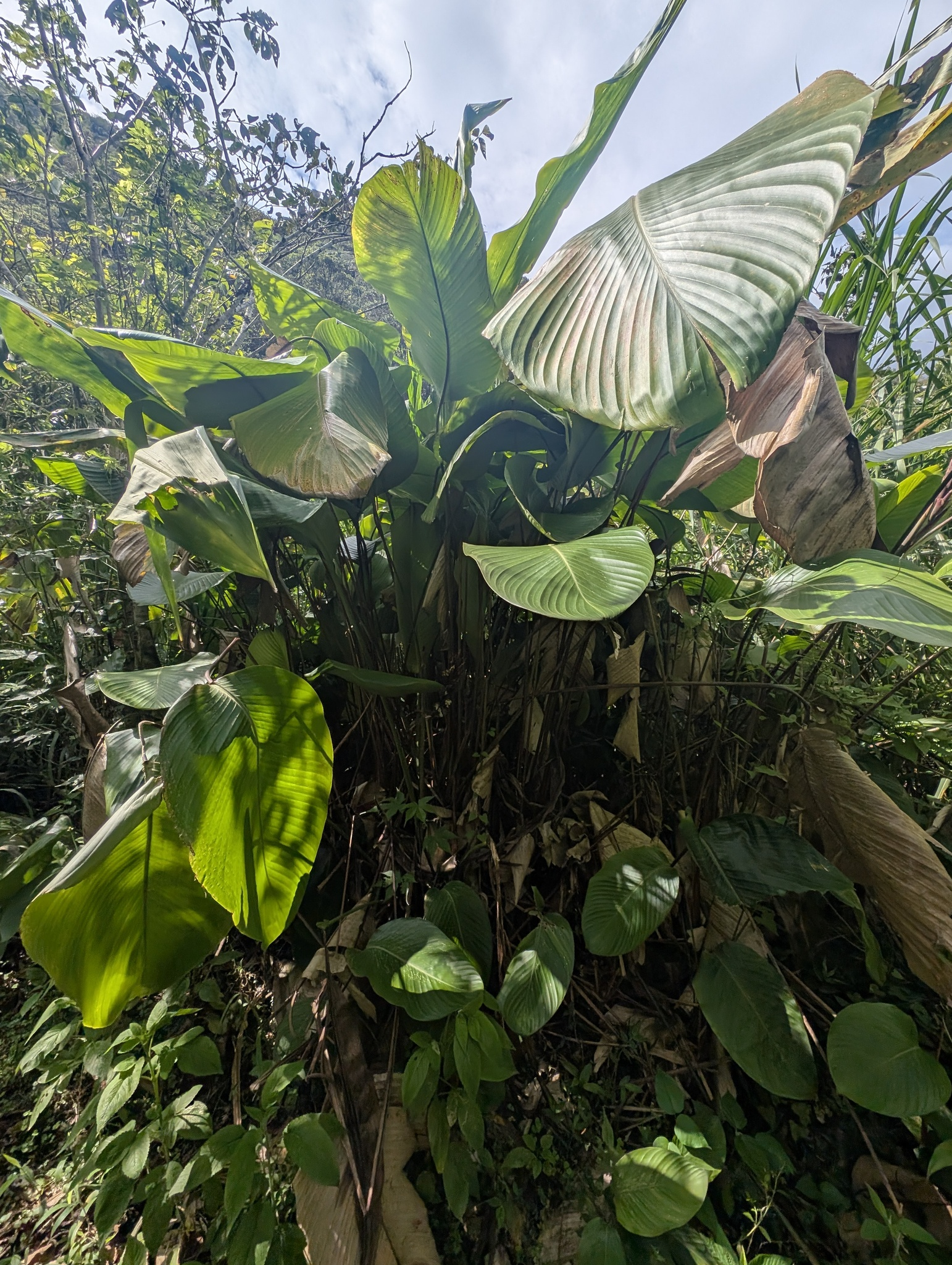

Conservation status
- Near Threatened (IUCN 3.1)

Scientific classification
- Kingdom: Plantae
- Clade: Embryophytes
- Clade: Tracheophytes
- Clade: Spermatophytes
- Clade: Angiosperms
- Clade: Monocots
- Clade: Commelinids
- Order: Zingiberales
- Family: Marantaceae
- Genus: Calathea
- Species: C. utilis

Binomial name
- Calathea utilis H.Kenn.

= Calathea utilis =

Species of flowering plant

Calathea utilis is a species of plant from the genus Calathea in the Marantaceae family. It is endemic to Ecuador. Its natural habitats are subtropical or tropical moist lowland forests and subtropical or tropical moist montane forests.

== Description ==
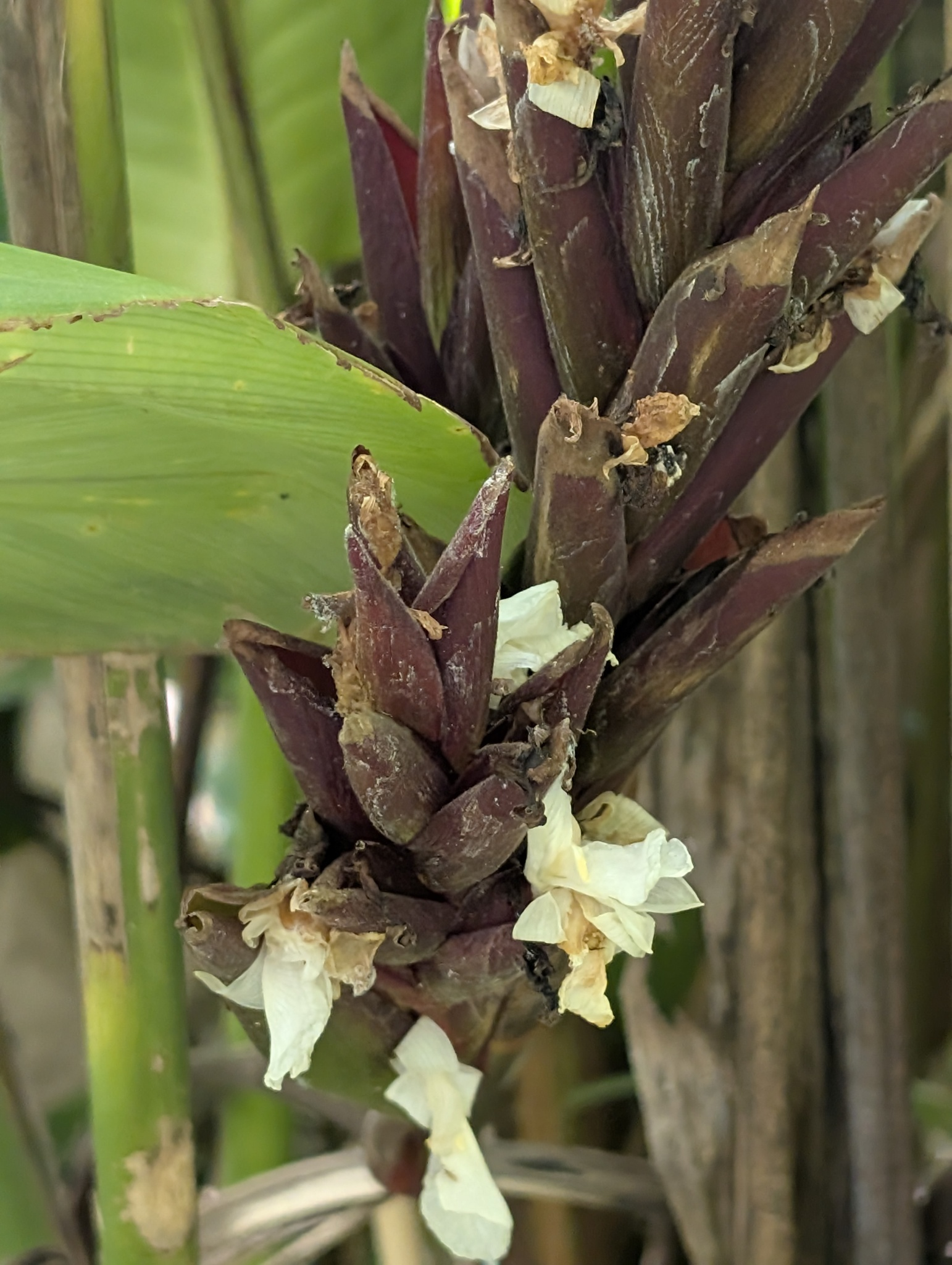
Inflorescence of Calathea utilis

Calathea utilis is a tall plant (around 2 to 4 meters when mature) with wide, ovale green leaves, with thick green petioles and a long pulvinus.The inflorescence of Calahtea utilis is made of multiple distichious bracts around a short peduncle. The bracts are long, spiky and usually green and brownish red, but can also be all green or all purple or red. The flowers are big and entirely white.
