= Calathea anulque =

Conservation status
- Endangered (IUCN 3.1)

Scientific classification
- Kingdom: Plantae
- Clade: Tracheophytes
- Clade: Angiosperms
- Clade: Monocots
- Clade: Commelinids
- Order: Zingiberales
- Family: Marantaceae
- Genus: Calathea
- Species: C. anulque

Binomial name
- Calathea anulque H.Kenn.

Species of plant

Calathea anulque is a species of plant in the Marantaceae family that is endemic to Ecuador. Its natural habitat is subtropical or tropical moist montane forests.
