= Acacia nesophila =

Scientific classification
- Kingdom: Plantae
- Clade: Tracheophytes
- Clade: Angiosperms
- Clade: Eudicots
- Clade: Rosids
- Order: Fabales
- Family: Fabaceae
- Subfamily: Caesalpinioideae
- Clade: Mimosoid clade
- Genus: Acacia
- Species: A. nesophila

Binomial name
- Acacia nesophila Pedley
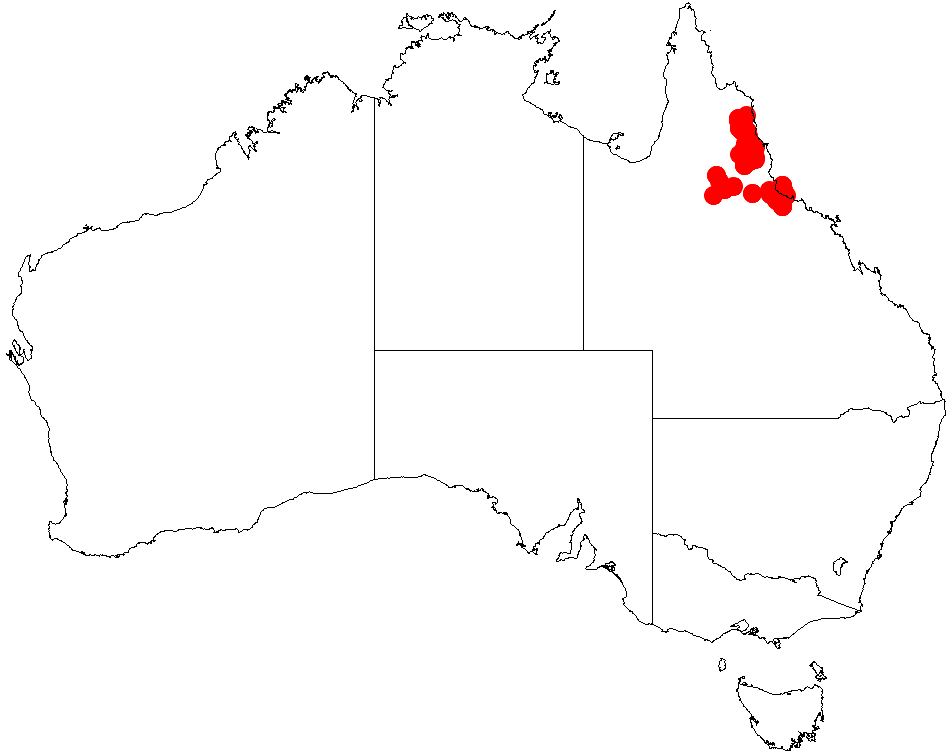
- Occurrence data from AVH

Synonyms
- Racosperma nesophilum (Pedley) Pedley

Species of legume

Acacia nesophila is a species of flowering plant in the family Fabaceae, and is endemic to north Queensland, Australia. It is a shrub with smooth grey bark, angular branchlets covered with minute woolly hairs, elliptic to narrowly elliptic phyllodes, spikes of yellow flowers and linear pods, raised over the seeds.

== Description ==
Acacia nesophila is a shrub that typically grows to a height of up to 3.5 m (11 ft) with smooth, grey bark, and angular, rather coarse branchlets covered with minute, woolly hairs. The phyllodes are elliptic to narrowly elliptic, 70–130 mm (2.8–5.1 in) long, 20–55 mm (0.79–2.17 in) wide, broadly rounded at the tip, sometimes covered with minute woolly hairs, otherwise glabrous. There are three to five prominent main veins, three or four minor veins per millimetre, and a gland up to 1 mm (0.039 in) above the pulvinus. The flowers are yellow and borne in spikes 30–40 mm (1.2–1.6 in) long. Flowering occurs at irregular intervals and the pods are linear, curved, 50–60 mm (2.0–2.4 in) long and raised over and shallowly constricted between the seeds. The seeds are oblong to more or less round, 3.5–4.5 mm (0.14–0.18 in) long and black.

== Taxonomy ==
Acacia nesophila was first formally described in 1974 by Leslie Pedley in Contributions from the Queensland Herbarium from specimens he collected. The specific epithet (nesophila) means 'island-loving'.

== Distribution and habitat ==
This species of wattle grows in shallow, rocky soils in woodland on ridges and hillsides in north-eastern Queensland from Cape York Peninsula to near Townsville, on the Atherton Tableland and on offshore islands.

== Conservation status ==
Acacia nesophila is listed as 'least concern' under the Queensland Government Nature Conservation Act 1992.
