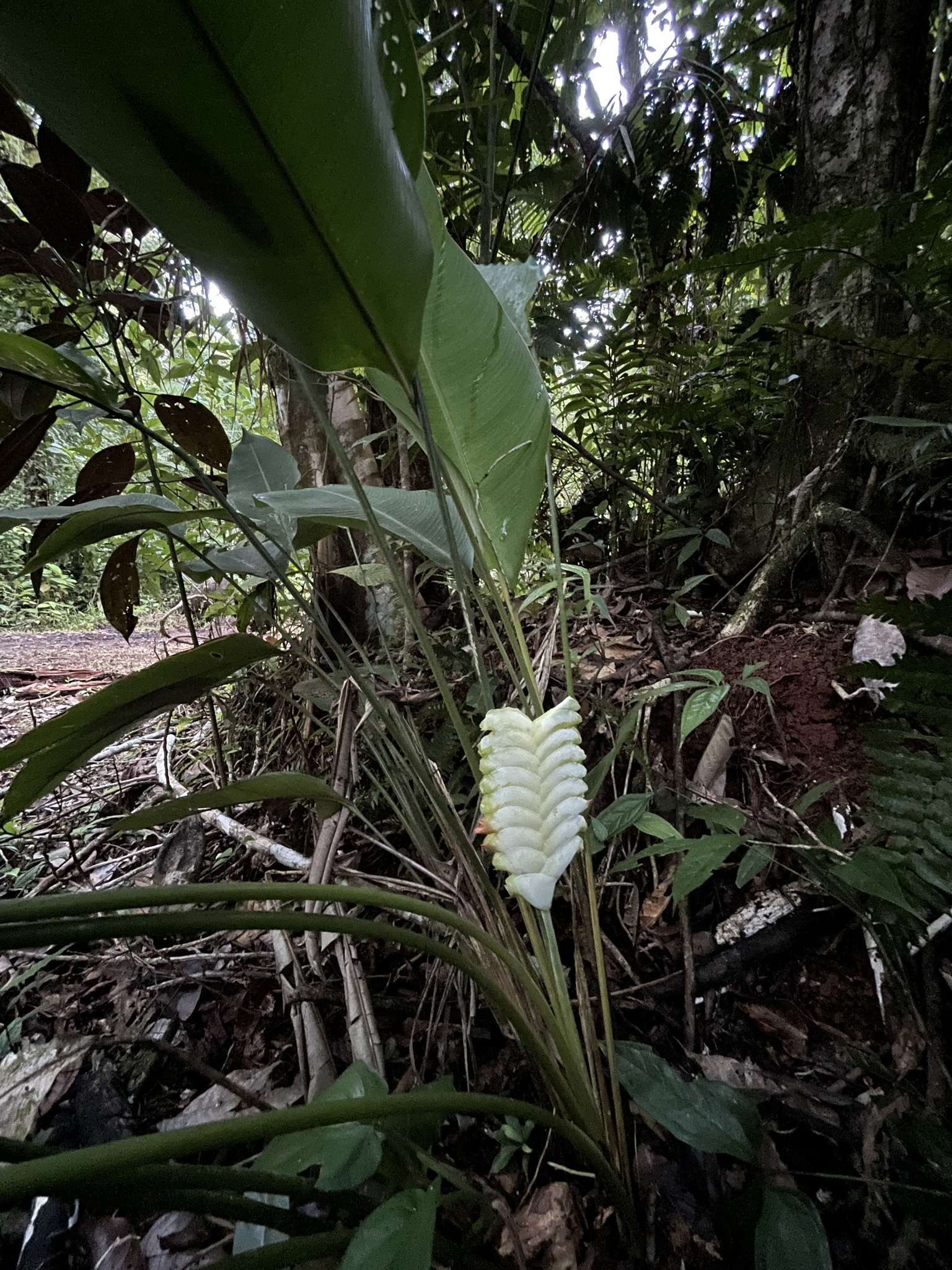

Scientific classification
- Kingdom: Plantae
- Clade: Embryophytes
- Clade: Tracheophytes
- Clade: Spermatophytes
- Clade: Angiosperms
- Clade: Monocots
- Clade: Commelinids
- Order: Zingiberales
- Family: Marantaceae
- Genus: Calathea
- Species: C. platystachya

Binomial name
- Calathea platystachya Standl. & L.O.Williams

= Calathea platystachya =

Species of plant

Calathea platystachya is a species of plant from the genus Calathea in the Marantaceae family. It is endemic to Costa Rica.

== Description ==
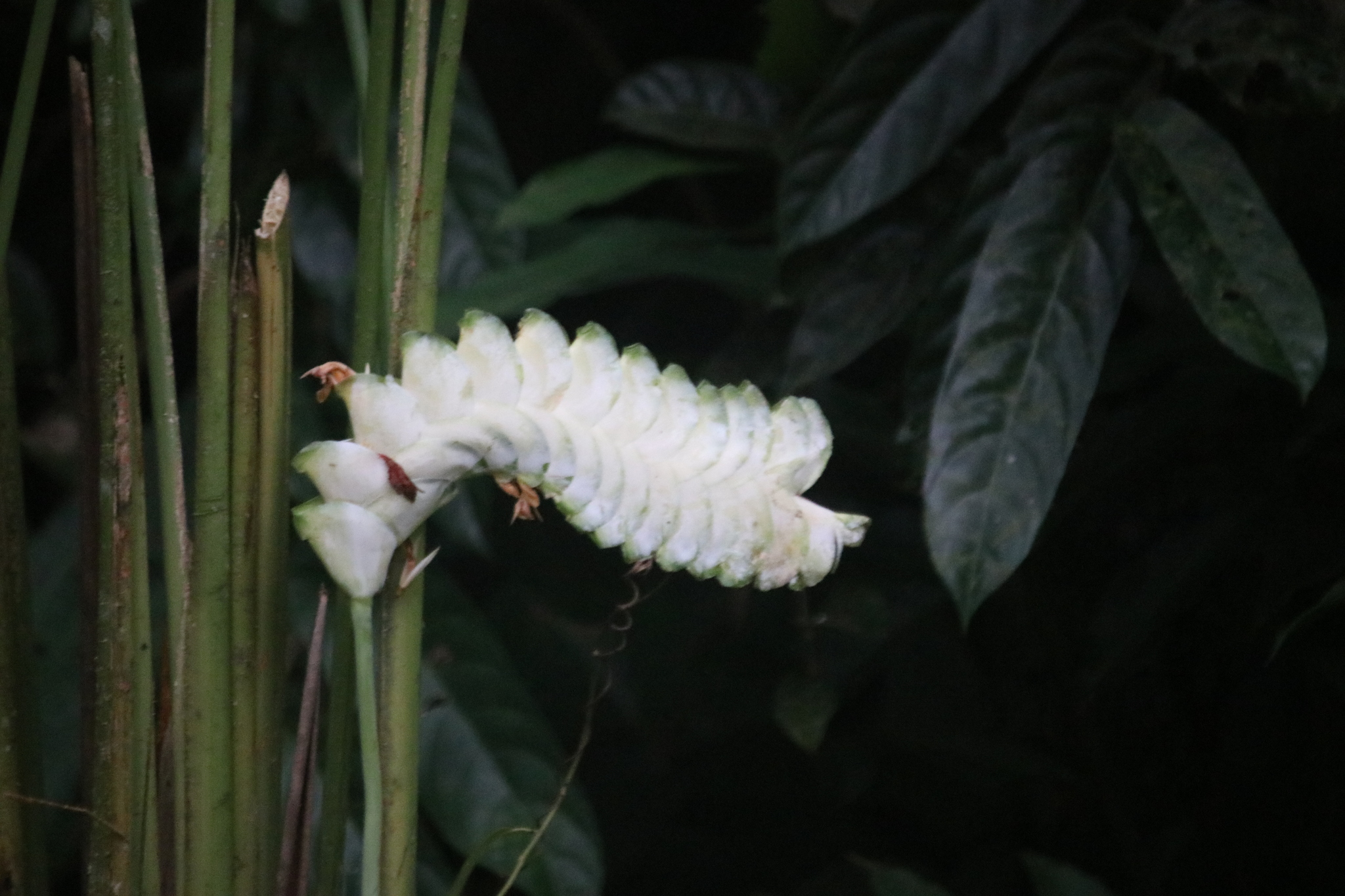
Inflorescence of Calathea platystachya

Calathea platystachya is a tall plant (around 2 to 4 meters when mature) with very long, huge green leaves, with long green petioles and a long pulvinus. The inflorescence of Calathea platystachya is made of multiple distichious bracts around a thick, green peduncle. The bracts are green with a characterizing white wax on the surface of each bracts. The flowers are small and orange.
