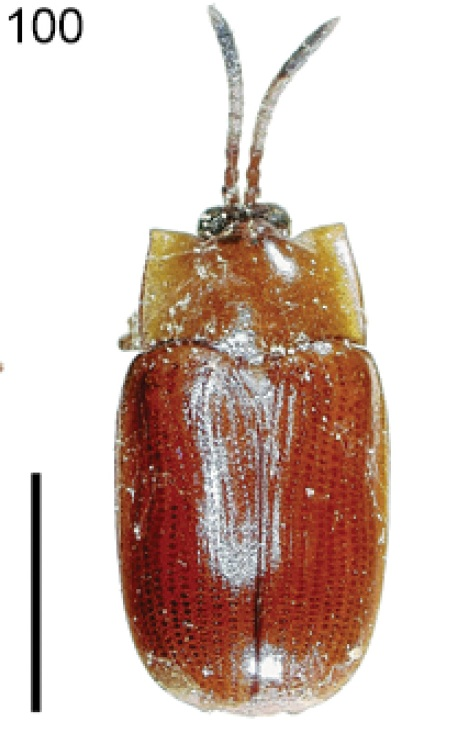

Scientific classification
- Kingdom: Animalia
- Phylum: Arthropoda
- Class: Insecta
- Order: Coleoptera
- Suborder: Polyphaga
- Infraorder: Cucujiformia
- Family: Chrysomelidae
- Genus: Cephaloleia
- Species: C. cognata

Binomial name
- Cephaloleia cognata Baly, 1869

= Cephaloleia cognata =

Species of beetle

Cephaloleia cognata is a species of beetle of the family Chrysomelidae. It is found in Brazil (Bahia), Peru and Venezuela.

== Description ==
Adults reach a length of about 5.6–6.8 mm. Adults are pale yellow, with the antennae (except antennomeres 1–2 which are reddish) black.

== Biology ==
Adults have been collected from Calathea lutea.
