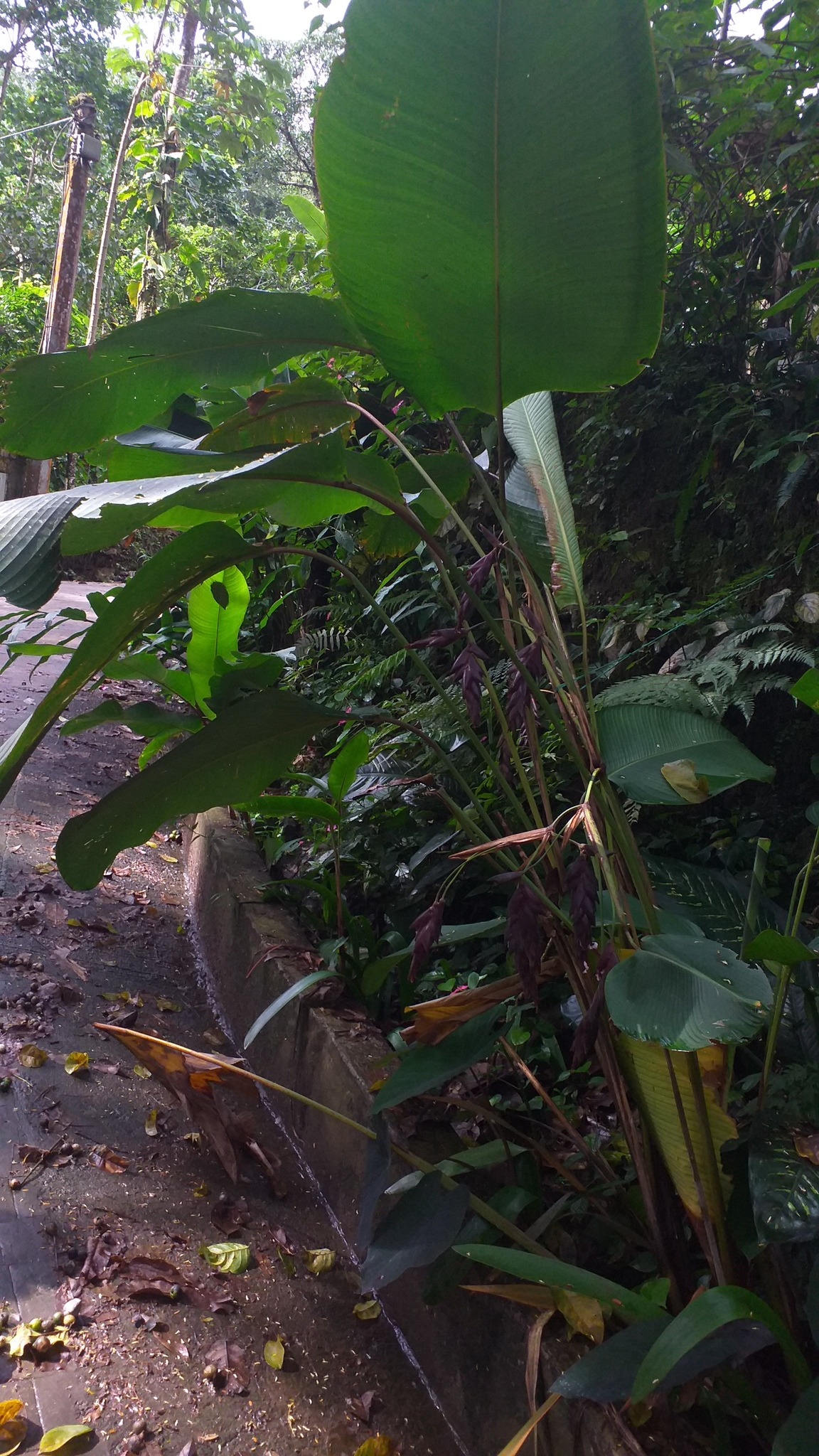

Scientific classification
- Kingdom: Plantae
- Clade: Embryophytes
- Clade: Tracheophytes
- Clade: Spermatophytes
- Clade: Angiosperms
- Clade: Monocots
- Clade: Commelinids
- Order: Zingiberales
- Family: Marantaceae
- Genus: Calathea
- Species: C. erythrolepis

Binomial name
- Calathea erythrolepis L.B.Sm. & Idrobo

= Calathea erythrolepis =

Species of plant

Calathea erythrolepis is a species of plant from the genus Calathea in the Marantaceae family. It is endemic to Colombia.

== Description ==
Calathea erythrolepis is a tall plant (around 2 meters when mature) with wide, ovale green leaves, thick green petioles and a long purple pulvinus. The inflorescence of C.erythrolepis is made of multiple distichious, spiky bracts spirally arranged around a long, thin green peduncle. The bracts are deep purple with small hair. The flowers are small with purple petals and pinkish white staminodes.

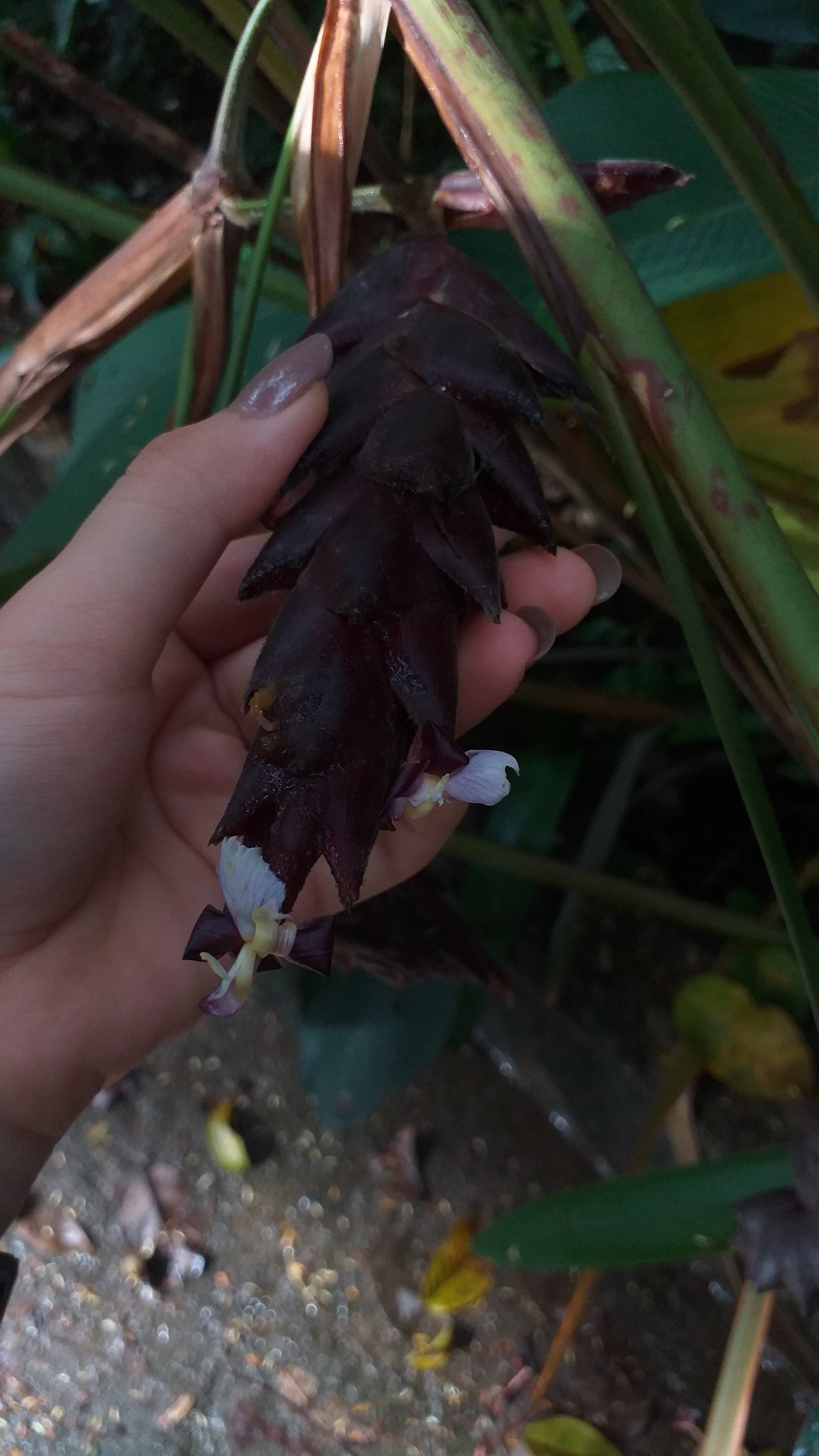
Inflorescence of Calathea erythrolepis
