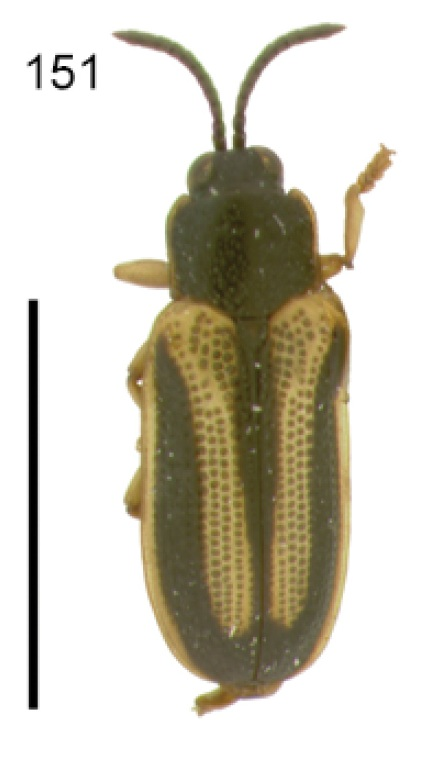

Scientific classification
- Kingdom: Animalia
- Phylum: Arthropoda
- Clade: Pancrustacea
- Class: Insecta
- Order: Coleoptera
- Suborder: Polyphaga
- Infraorder: Cucujiformia
- Family: Chrysomelidae
- Genus: Cephaloleia
- Species: C. gemma

Binomial name
- Cephaloleia gemma Staines, 2014

= Cephaloleia gemma =

Species of beetle

Cephaloleia gemma is a species of beetle of the family Chrysomelidae. It is found in Bolivia and Brazil (Matto Grosso, Rondonia).

== Description ==
Adults reach a length of about 4 mm. Adults are black, with the lateral margin of the pronotum paler. The elytron has a broad pale yellow vitta and a pale lateral margin. The legs are yellow.

== Biology ==
Adults have been collected off Calathea species.

== Etymology ==
The species name is derived from Latin gemma (meaning bud, eye or jewel) and refers to the large eyes and beautiful appearance of this species.
