= Calathea latrinotecta =

Conservation status
- Vulnerable (IUCN 3.1)

Scientific classification
- Kingdom: Plantae
- Clade: Embryophytes
- Clade: Tracheophytes
- Clade: Spermatophytes
- Clade: Angiosperms
- Clade: Monocots
- Clade: Commelinids
- Order: Zingiberales
- Family: Marantaceae
- Genus: Calathea
- Species: C. latrinotecta

Binomial name
- Calathea latrinotecta H.Kenn.

Species of flowering plant

Calathea latrinotecta is a species of plant in the Marantaceae family. It is endemic to Ecuador and southern Colombia. Its natural habitat is subtropical or tropical moist montane forests. It is used medicinally.
