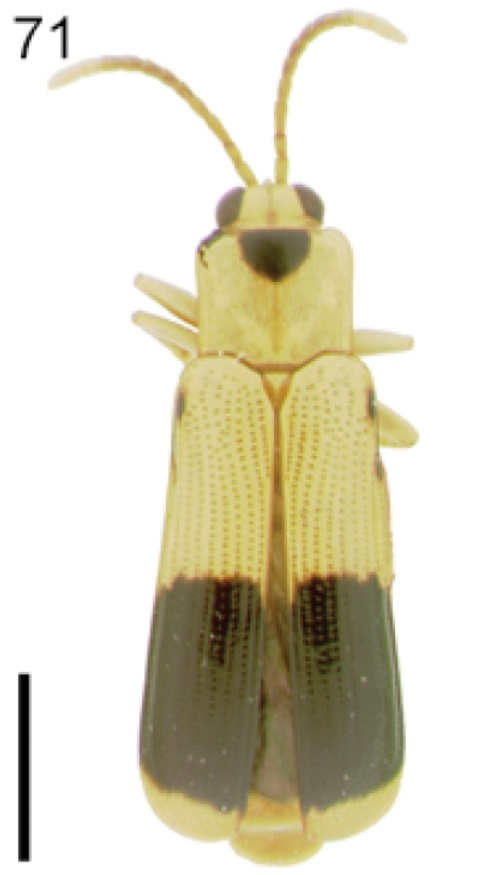

Scientific classification
- Kingdom: Animalia
- Phylum: Arthropoda
- Class: Insecta
- Order: Coleoptera
- Suborder: Polyphaga
- Infraorder: Cucujiformia
- Family: Chrysomelidae
- Genus: Cephaloleia
- Species: C. angustacollis

Binomial name
- Cephaloleia angustacollis Staines, 2014

= Cephaloleia angustacollis =

Species of beetle

Cephaloleia angustacollis is a species of beetle of the family Chrysomelidae. It is found in Ecuador.

== Description ==
Adults reach a length of about 9.1–10.3 mm. Adults are pale yellow. The pronotum has a black demilune-shape behind the head and the elytron has a wide black transverse band behind the middle, a dark macula laterally on the humerus, and anelongate dark macula covering puncture rows 9 and 10 from the humerus to just before the middle.

== Biology ==
The hostplant is unknown, but adults have been collected on Calathea species.

== Etymology ==
The species name is derived from Latin angustus (meaning narrow) and collis (meaning neck) and refers to the narrow pronotum in this species.
