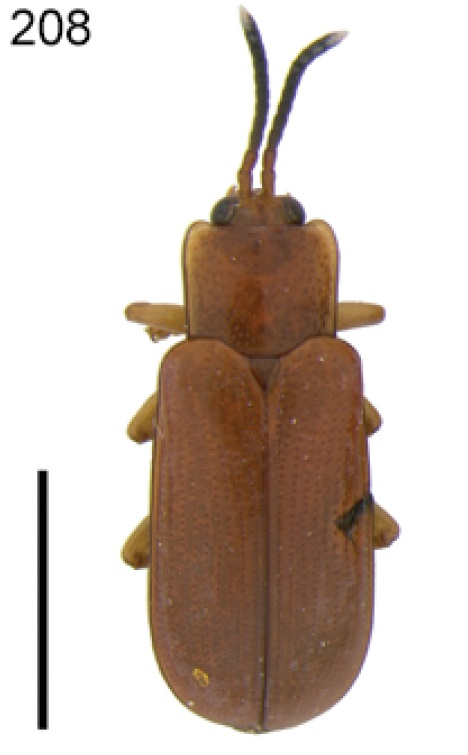

Scientific classification
- Kingdom: Animalia
- Phylum: Arthropoda
- Class: Insecta
- Order: Coleoptera
- Suborder: Polyphaga
- Infraorder: Cucujiformia
- Family: Chrysomelidae
- Genus: Cephaloleia
- Species: C. perplexa

Binomial name
- Cephaloleia perplexa Baly, 1885

= Cephaloleia perplexa =

Species of beetle

Cephaloleia perplexa is a species of beetle of the family Chrysomelidae. It is found in Belize, Costa Rica, Guatemala and Mexico.

== Description ==
Adults reach a length of about 5.1–6.3 mm. Adults are reddish-brown, while the eyes and antennae are darker.

== Biology ==
The recorded host plants are Heliconia bourgaeana, Heliconia lathispatha, Cephaloleia inocephala, Cephaloleia lutea, Cephaloleia similis, Calathea species, Cephaloleia foliosa, Cephaloleia guzmanioides, Cephaloleia leucostachys, Cephaloleia marantifolia and Pleiostachya leiostachya.
