= Calathea hagbergii =

Conservation status
- Endangered (IUCN 3.1)

Scientific classification
- Kingdom: Plantae
- Clade: Tracheophytes
- Clade: Angiosperms
- Clade: Monocots
- Clade: Commelinids
- Order: Zingiberales
- Family: Marantaceae
- Genus: Calathea
- Species: C. hagbergii

Binomial name
- Calathea hagbergii H.Kenn.

Species of plant

Calathea hagbergii is a species of flowering plant in the family Marantaceae. It is endemic to Ecuador, where it is known from only a single collection.
