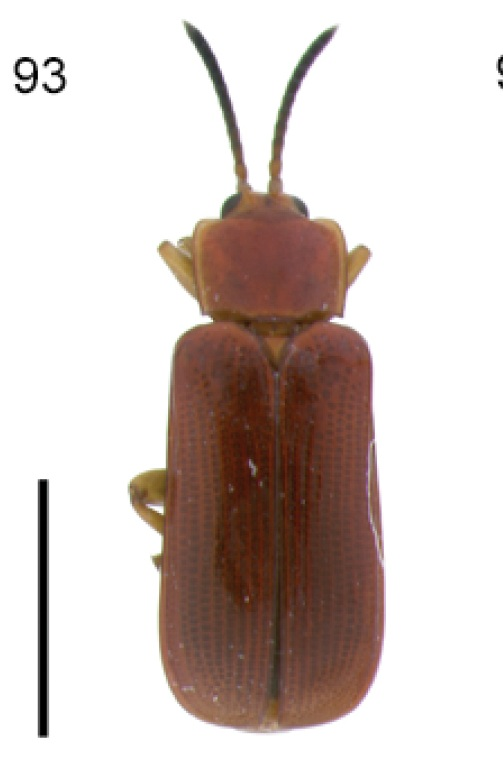

Scientific classification
- Kingdom: Animalia
- Phylum: Arthropoda
- Class: Insecta
- Order: Coleoptera
- Suborder: Polyphaga
- Infraorder: Cucujiformia
- Family: Chrysomelidae
- Genus: Cephaloleia
- Species: C. calathae

Binomial name
- Cephaloleia calathae García-Robledo & Staines, 2014

= Cephaloleia calathae =

Species of beetle

Cephaloleia calathae is a species of beetle of the family Chrysomelidae. It is found in Costa Rica.

== Description ==
Adults reach a length of about 7–8.4 mm. Adults are reddish-brown, with the venter and legs paler and the antennae (except the basal two antennomeres) and eyes black.

== Biology ==
Adults have been collected off Calathea crotalifera and Cephaloleia guzmanioides.

== Etymology ==
The species is named for the genus of the host plant.
