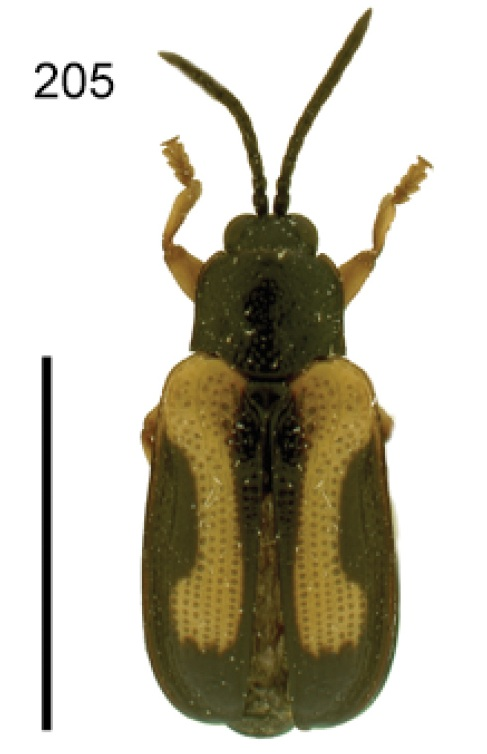

Scientific classification
- Kingdom: Animalia
- Phylum: Arthropoda
- Class: Insecta
- Order: Coleoptera
- Suborder: Polyphaga
- Infraorder: Cucujiformia
- Family: Chrysomelidae
- Genus: Cephaloleia
- Species: C. parenthesis

Binomial name
- Cephaloleia parenthesis Weise, 1904

Synonyms
- Cephalolia parenthesis reducta Pic, 1926

= Cephaloleia parenthesis =

Species of beetle

Cephaloleia parenthesis is a species of beetle of the family Chrysomelidae. It is found in Mexico, Peru and Venezuela.

== Description ==
Adults reach a length of about 4.3 mm. Adults are dark with reddish-yellow markings. The elytron has a yellow parenthesis-shaped vitta. The legs are yellowish.

== Biology ==
Adults have been collected on Calathea species.
