= C. utilis =

C. utilis may refer to:

- Calathea utilis, a plant species endemic to Ecuador
- Candida utilis, the torula, a yeast species

== See also ==
- Utilis (disambiguation)
