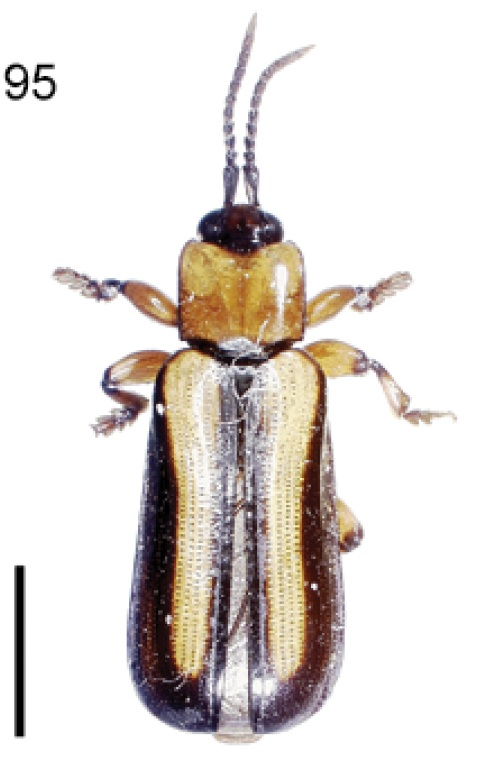

Scientific classification
- Kingdom: Animalia
- Phylum: Arthropoda
- Class: Insecta
- Order: Coleoptera
- Suborder: Polyphaga
- Infraorder: Cucujiformia
- Family: Chrysomelidae
- Genus: Cephaloleia
- Species: C. championi

Binomial name
- Cephaloleia championi Baly, 1885

= Cephaloleia championi =

Species of beetle

Cephaloleia championi is a species of beetle of the family Chrysomelidae. It is found in Costa Rica and Panama.

== Description ==
Adults reach a length of about 8–9.6 mm. Adults are reddish-yellow with the head, antennae (except antennomeres 10–11), all margins of the pronotum and sutural and lateral vittae of the elytron black. The latter with a black lateral margin.

== Biology ==
Adults have been collected in Heliconia leaf rolls, as well as on Calathea lutea and Heliconia imbricata.
