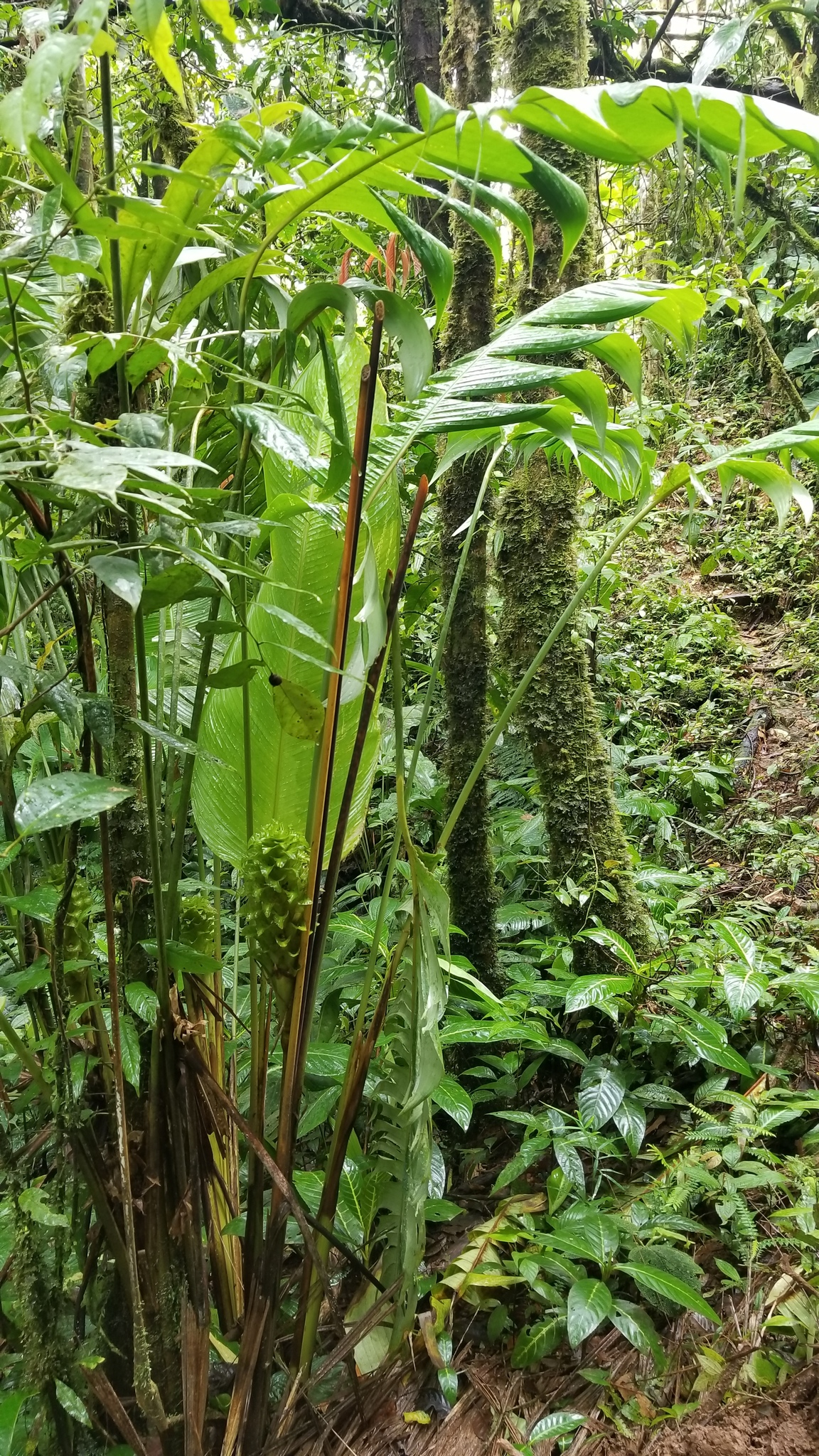

Scientific classification
- Kingdom: Plantae
- Clade: Tracheophytes
- Clade: Angiosperms
- Clade: Monocots
- Clade: Commelinids
- Order: Zingiberales
- Family: Marantaceae
- Genus: Calathea
- Species: C. guzmanioides

Binomial name
- Calathea guzmanioides L.B.Sm. & Idrobo

= Calathea guzmanioides =

Species of flowering plant

Calathea guzmanioides is a species of plant from the genus Calathea in the Marantaceae family. It is native to Colombia, Costa Rica, Ecuador and Panamá.

== Description ==
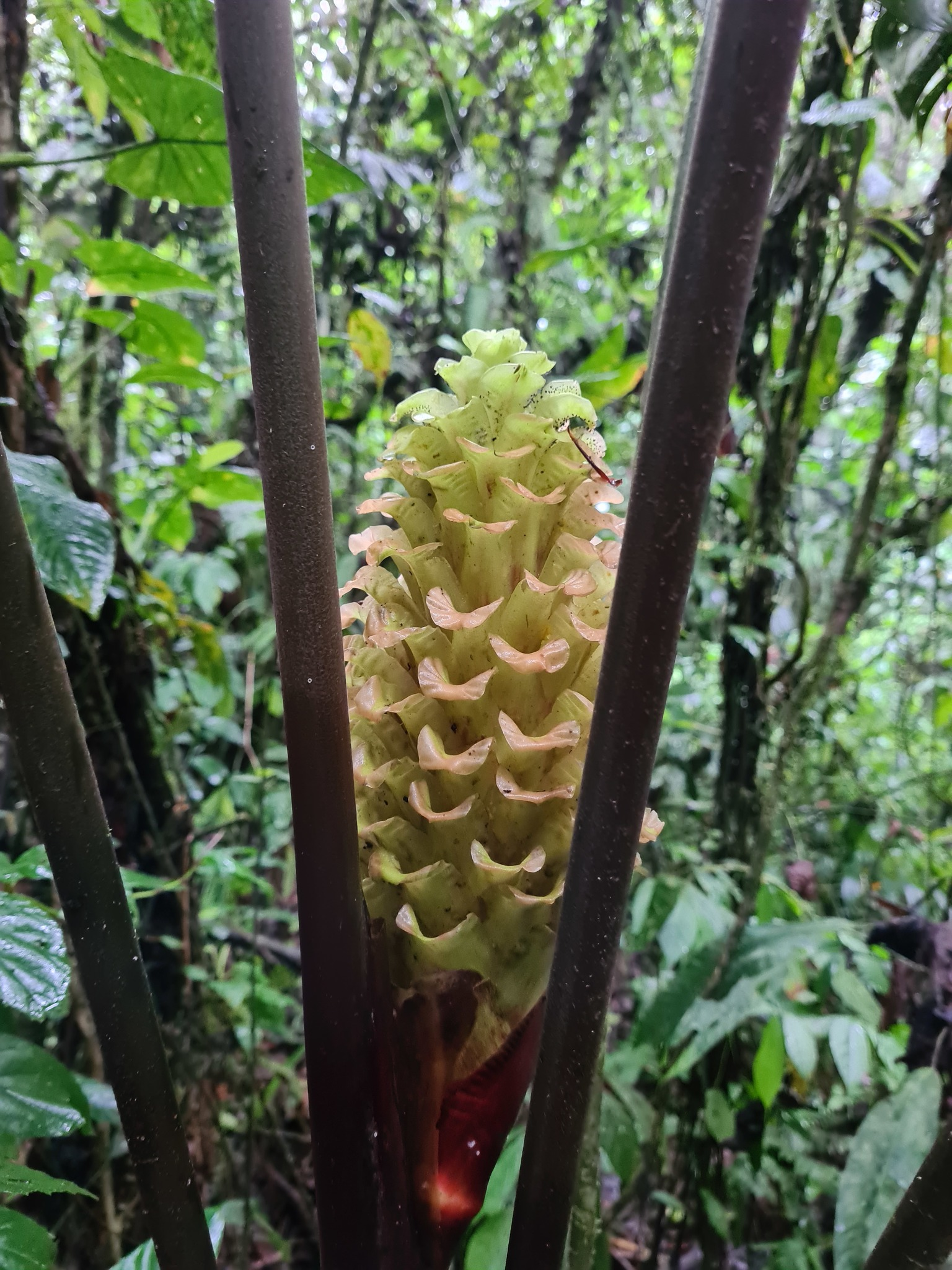
Inlforescence of Calathea guzmanioides

Calathea guzmanioides is a tall plant (around 2 to 4 meters when mature) with long, huge green leaves with long, thick petioles and a long pulvinus. This species is highly polymorphic, the colors of each part of the plant can vary a lot. Undersides of the leaves can be green or purple, same for petioles and pulvinus. The inflorescence of C.guzmanioides is made of multiple bracts spirally arranged on a thick, short peduncle coming from a node of a cauline leaf. The bracts are round and usaully have dried tips, the bracts are also polymorphic for their colors and shape, which can go from green to yellow or red. The flowers are small with purple petals and yellow staminodes.

== Uses ==
In Ecuador, Calathea guzmanioides is used as an ornamental plant.
