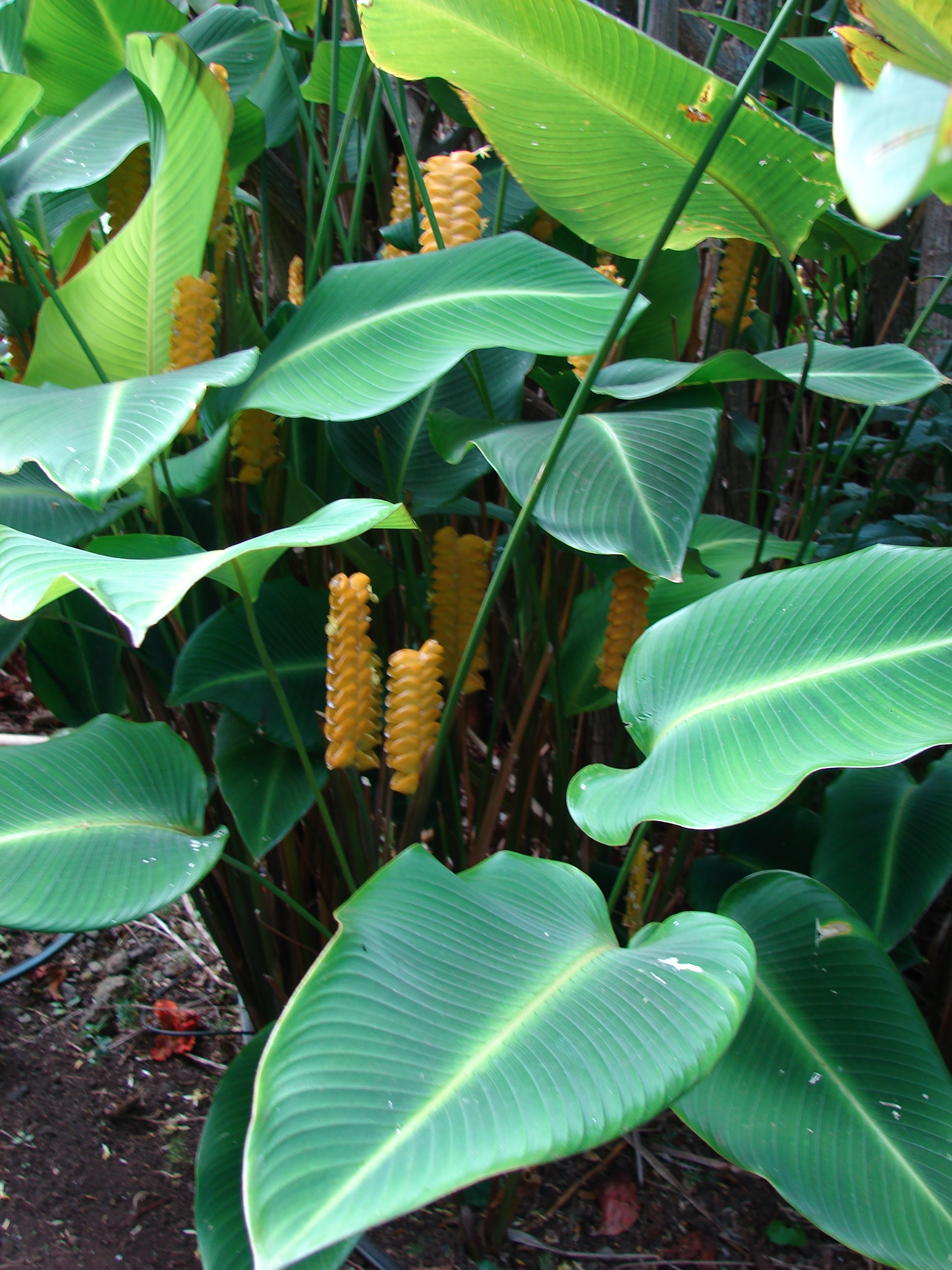

Scientific classification
- Kingdom: Plantae
- Clade: Tracheophytes
- Clade: Angiosperms
- Clade: Monocots
- Clade: Commelinids
- Order: Zingiberales
- Family: Marantaceae
- Genus: Calathea
- Species: C. crotalifera

Binomial name
- Calathea crotalifera S.Watson

Synonyms
- Calathea insignis Petersen ex Eggers (1893); Calathea insignis Petersen (1890); Calathea quadratispica Woodson (1939); Calathea sclerobractea K.Schum. (1902); Phyllodes insignis (Petersen) Kuntze (1891)

= Calathea crotalifera =

Species of plant

Calathea crotalifera, the rattlesnake plant, rattle shaker or cascabel, is a species of flowering plant from the genus Calathea in the family Marantaceae. It is native to Belize, Bolivia, Brazil North, Colombia, Costa Rica, Ecuador, Guatemala, Honduras, Mexico, Panamá, Peru, Venezuela, and it has been introduced to Hawai'i and Puerto Rico.

== Description ==
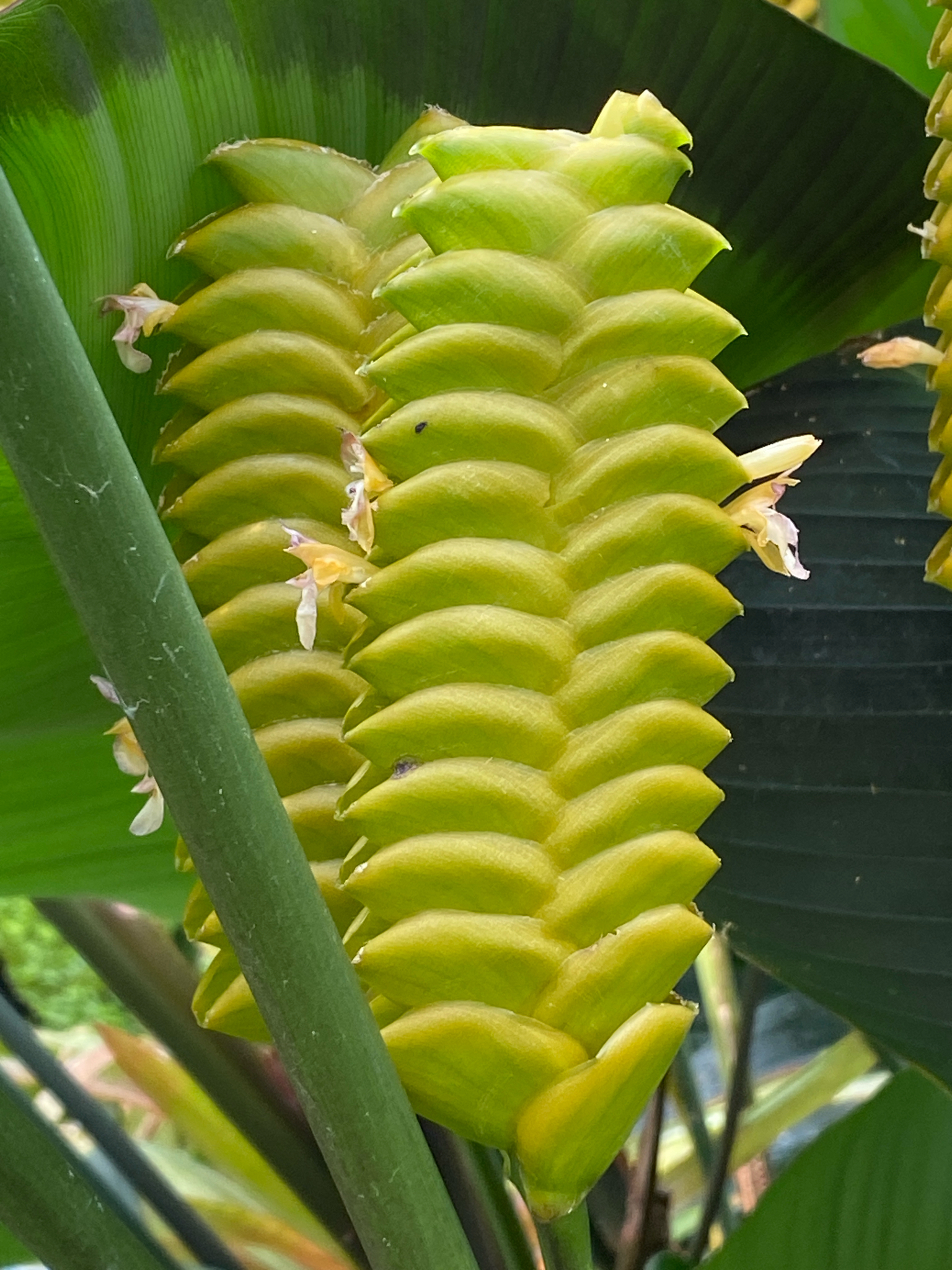
Inflorescence of Calathea crotalifera

Calathea crotalifera is a tall plant (around 2 to 4 meters when mature) with huge, pointy, velvety, dark green leaves, with long and thick green petioles and a long pulvinus. The middle vein above the leaf is often lighter surrounded by a light green band. The inflorescence of Calathea crotalifera is made of multiple distichious bracts set around a thick green peduncle. The bracts are usually yellow but can vary a lot from green to intense dark red. The flowers are little with yellow or green petals and staminodes that vary from white to yellow to pink.

== Uses ==
Calathea crotalifera is grown as an ornamental plant. The Tsáchila people of Ecuador use the leaves of Calathea crotalifera to steam food, as well as to make temporary shelters.
