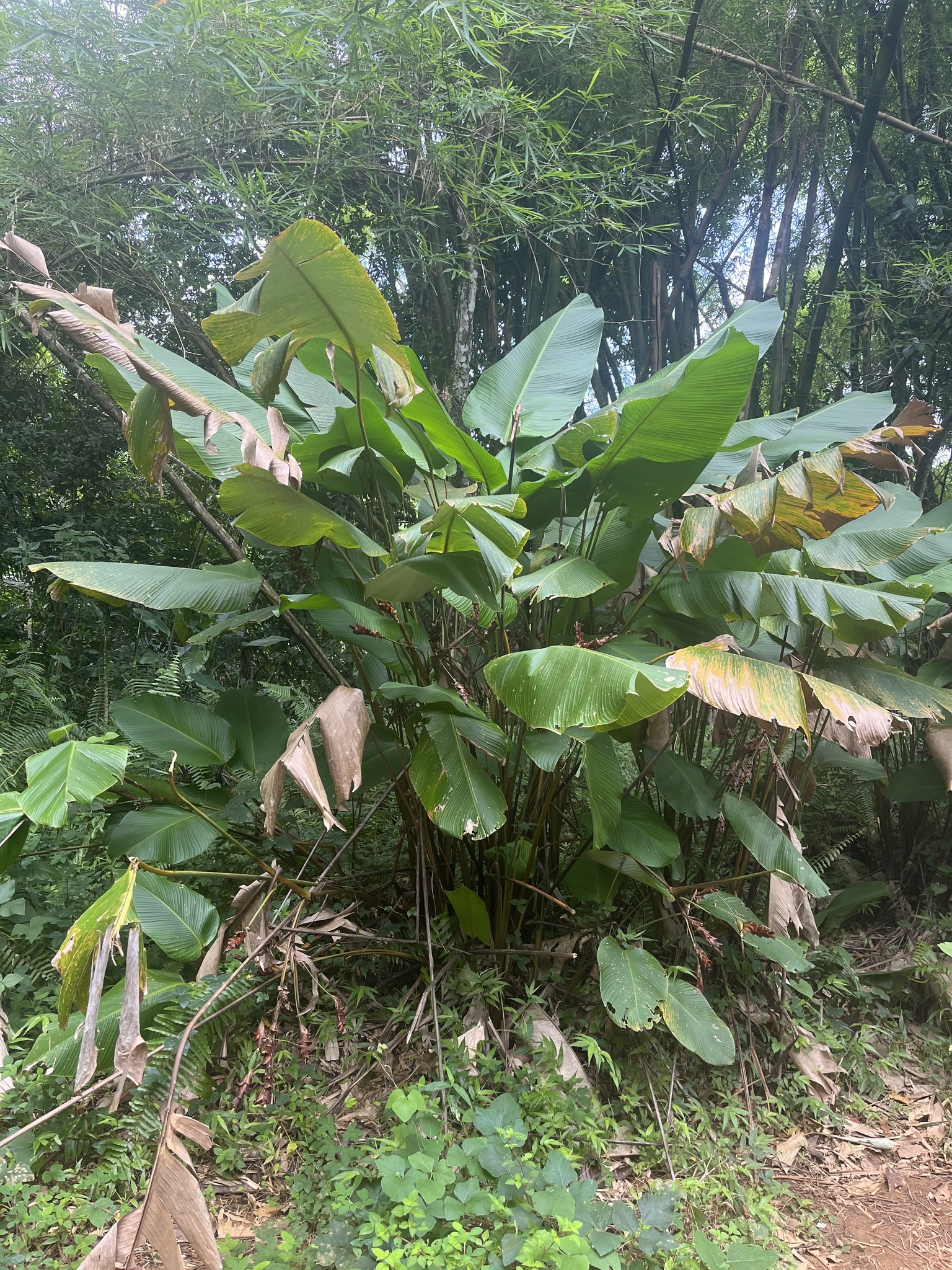

Scientific classification
- Kingdom: Plantae
- Clade: Tracheophytes
- Clade: Angiosperms
- Clade: Monocots
- Clade: Commelinids
- Order: Zingiberales
- Family: Marantaceae
- Genus: Calathea
- Species: C. lutea

Binomial name
- Calathea lutea (Aubl.) E.Mey. ex Schult.

Synonyms
- Maranta lutea Aubl. (1775); Phrynium luteum (Aubl.) Sweet (1830); Phyllodes lutea (Aubl.) Kuntze (1891); Calathea cachibou (Jacq.) Lindl. ex Horan. (1862); Calathea discolor G.Mey. (1818); Calathea magnifica C.V.Morton & Skutch (1930); Maranta argentea W.Bull (1884); Maranta cachibou Jacq. (1806); Maranta casupo Jacq. (1806); Maranta disticha Buc'hoz (1783); Phrynium casupo (Jacq.) Roscoe (1827)

= Calathea lutea =

Species of plant

Calathea lutea, called the bijao, cigar calathea, Cuban cigar, Mexican cigar plant, Habana cigar, and pampano, is a species of flowering plant from the genus Calathea in the family Marantaceae. It is native to Belize, Bolivia, Brazil North, Colombia, Costa Rica, Ecuador, El Salvador, French Guiana, Guatemala, Guyana, Honduras, Jamaica, Leeward Is., Mexico, Nicaragua, Panamá, Peru, Puerto Rico, Suriname, Trinidad-Tobago, Venezuela, Venezuelan Antilles and Windward Is.

== Description ==
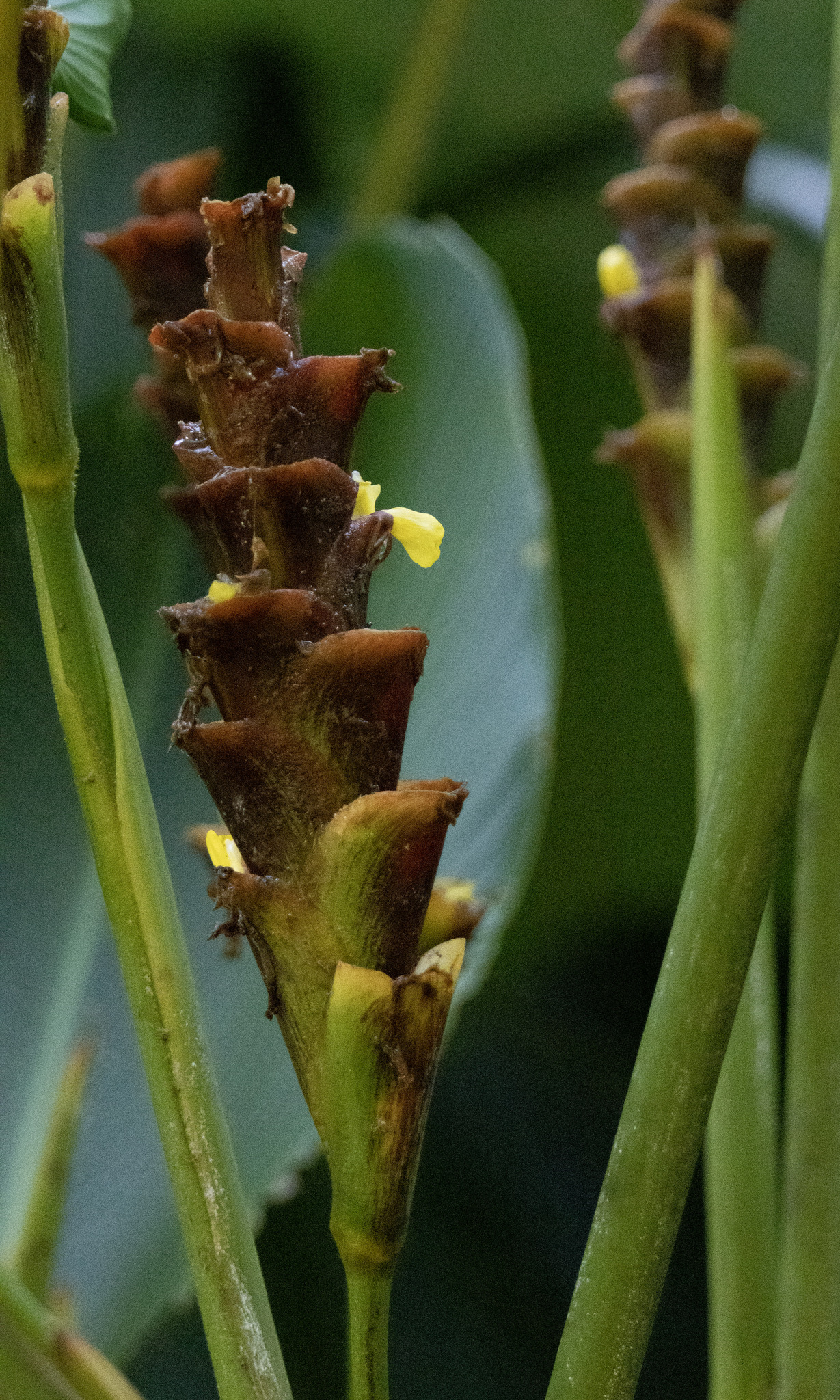
Inflorescence of Calathea lutea

Calathea lutea is a tall plant (around 2 to 4 meters when mature) with huge, ovale, green leaves, with thick, long, yellowish green petioles and a long pulvinus. The inflorescence of this species is made of multiple distachious bracts set on a long, green peduncle. The bracts are brownish red and sometimes green with orange tips. The flowers are small with purple petals and yellow staminodes. The plant is often used as an ornemental plant.

== Uses ==
In the Brazilian Amazon, local artisans use the flower stalks to make woven handicrafts such as sieves, baskets, and board games. The leaves of Calathea lutea are often used as a wrapping material to cook food in Amazonian countries. Furthermore, the Tsáchila people of Ecuador use the leaves of Calathea lutea as roofing material.

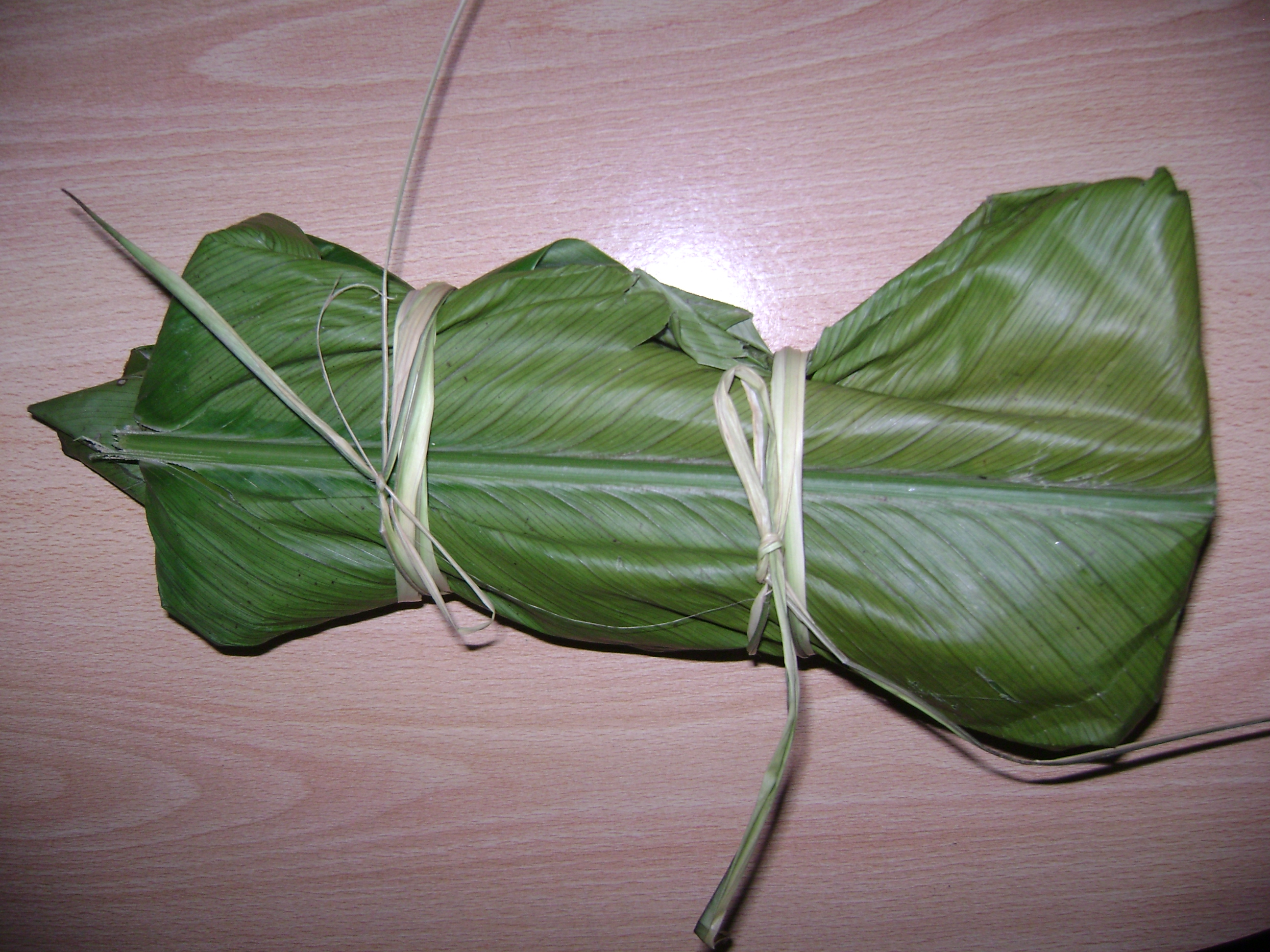

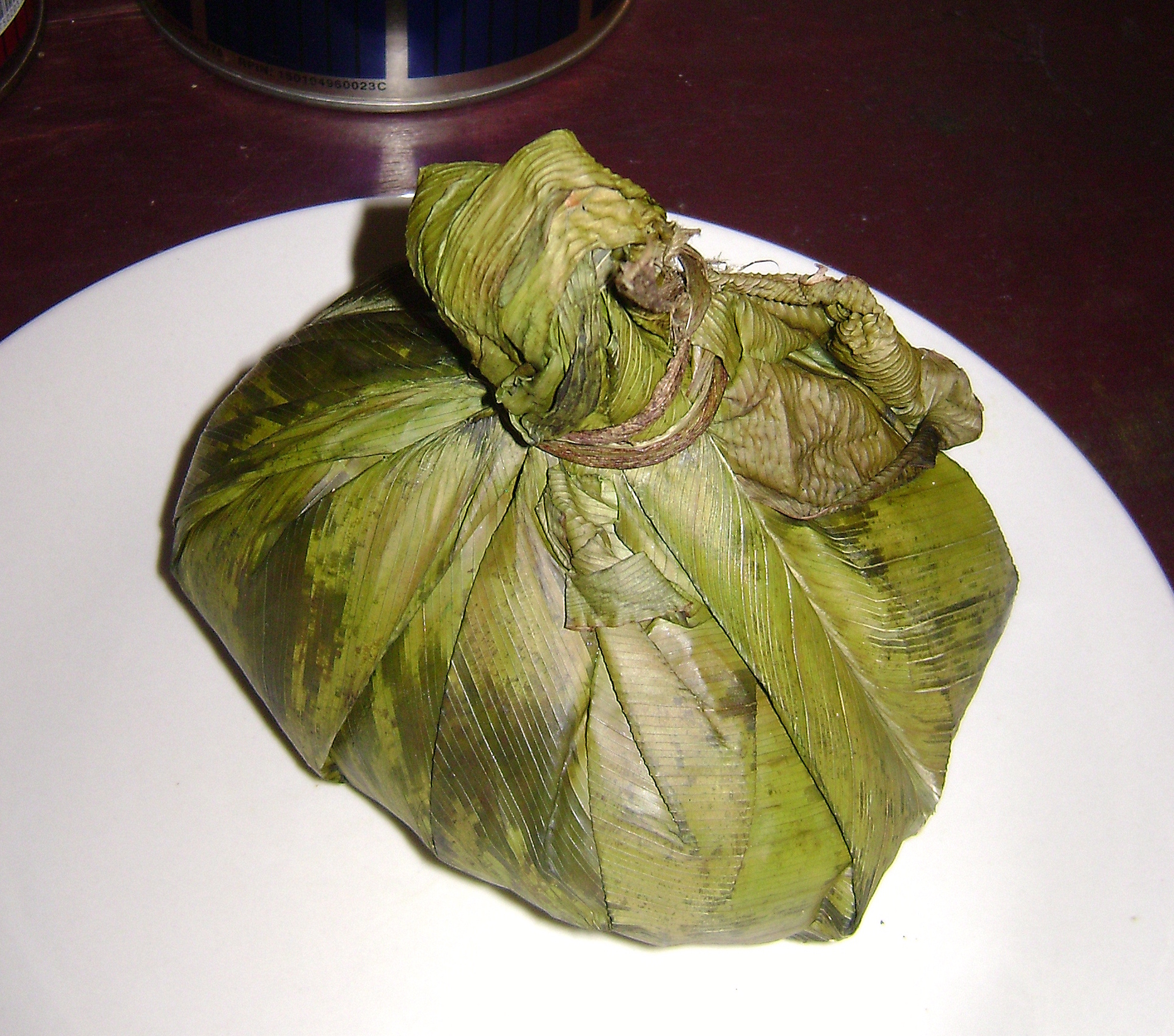
