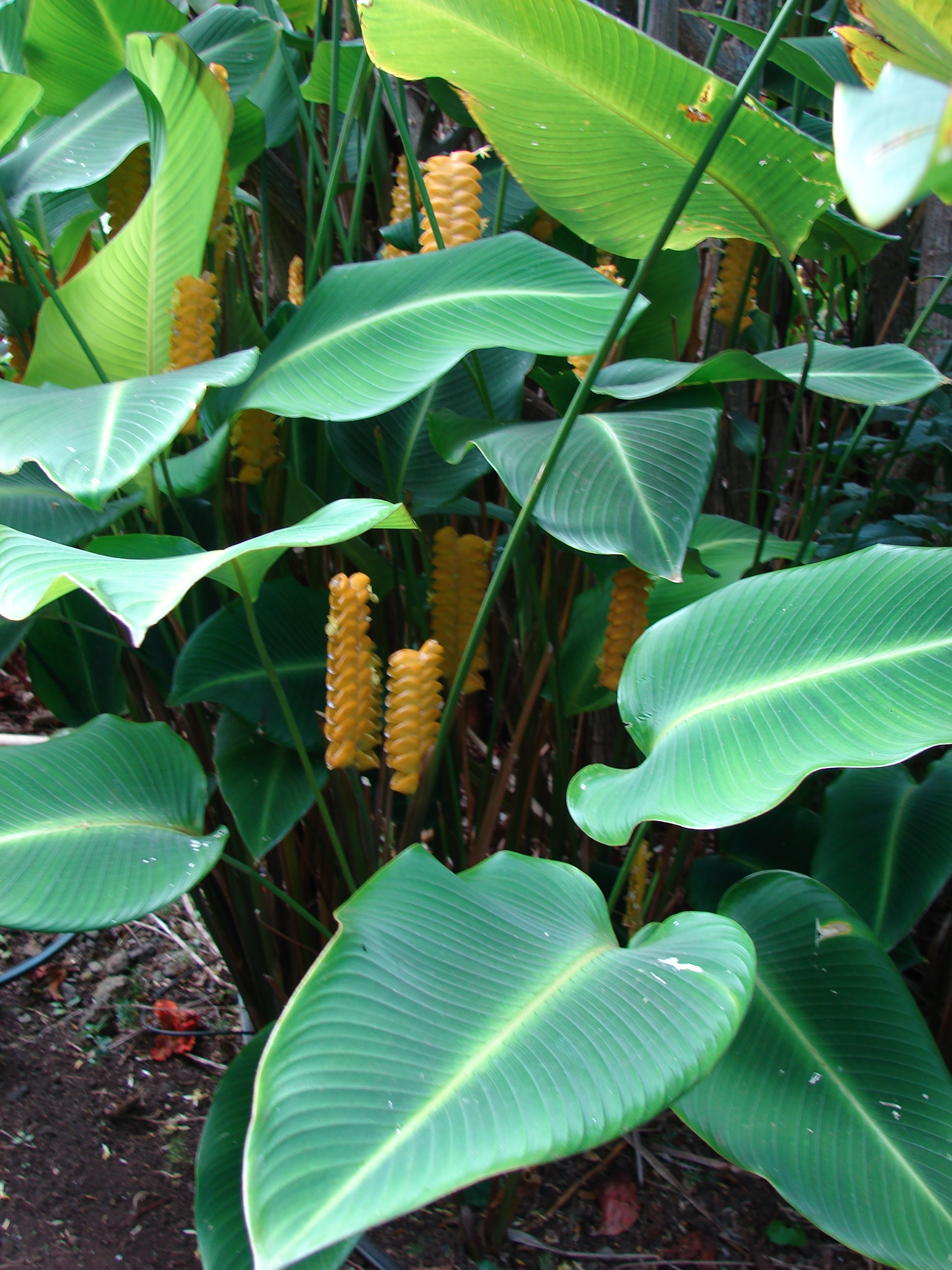
- Calathea crotalifera

Scientific classification
- Kingdom: Plantae
- Clade: Tracheophytes
- Clade: Angiosperms
- Clade: Monocots
- Clade: Commelinids
- Order: Zingiberales
- Family: Marantaceae
- Genus: Calathea; G.Mey.

= Calathea =

Genus of plants

Calathea is a genus of plants in the family Marantaceae. It's species are native to tropical America and have been introduced in other areas, such as Hawaii. They are known for their large green leaves and are grown as ornamental plants in outdoor gardens. The genus currently has 59 accepted species.

The genus Calathea is closely related to the genus Goeppertia, which it was separated from based on phylogenetic studies made in 2012. While many Goeppertia species are grown as indoor plants for their colorful and patterned leaves, Calathea species moslty have uniformly green leaves.

== Description ==
Calathea are rhizomatous plants with large and broad green leaves. Depending on the species, they can grow to around 2 meters (6.5ft) or more when mature. During the night, the leaves fold up. In the morning, the leaves unfurl. This phenomenon, known as nyctinasty, is made possible by a small joint the plant possesses between the stem and leaf, called a pulvinus.

The flowers of Calathea can be green, yellow, purple or white. The flowers have an asymmetrical structure with three petals and three free sepals. They are surrounded by bracts, which are often more attractive than its flowers. In many Calathea species, the bracts are distichous, which means they are disposed in two distinct vertical rows, only a small amount of Calathea species have big, wide spirally arranged bracts inflorescences.

== Earlier taxonomic work ==
The genus Calathea was first described in 1818 by Georg Friedrich Wilhelm Meyer with the species Calathea discolor, now considered as a synonym of Calathea lutea.

In 1902, Karl Schumann defined a better understanding of the genus Calathea, which he moved (from other genera) around 100 species and more into. He devided the genus into four subgenera : Eucalathea, Macropus, Pseudophrynium and Microcephalum. These groups were distinguised by specific vegetative and inflorescence morphological characters.

Over the following decades, the genus continued to grow as new species were described or transferred into. Botanists such as Helen Kennedy contributed to a major part of that later work.

== Later taxonomic treatment ==
In 2001, Lennart Andersson and Mark Chase published a phylogentic study made on a broad selection of Marantaceae and other Zingiberales species. The study suggested that the traditional Calathea genus might need to be revised as it was found to be paraphyletic. Unfortunately, the study did not cover enough Calathea taxa to propose an actual change.

It is only in 2012, with a phylogenetic study made by Finn Borchsenius, Luz Stella Suárez Suárez, and Linda M. Prince, that the earlier work was brought back. This time, way more species were sampled, with around 70 Marantaceae species. The results were clear, the broad Calathea genus had actually, two major and distinct evolutionary lineage and needed to be revised. The first lineage included the subgenus Calathea, the C.Lanicaulis group and the Sanblasia genus, while the second formed a strongly supported group. They finally retained the name Calathea for the first group and brought back the genus Goeppertia, which was originally described by Nees in 1831 with Goeppertia zebrina, for the second.

- - Goeppertia
  - - Monotagma
    - - Calathea
      - - Pleiostachya
        - Ischnosiphon

The revision resulted in 246 new combinations, transferring most of the species formerly known as Calathea into Goeppertia.

== List of species ==
The following species are accepted:

- Calathea anderssonii H.Kenn.
- Calathea anulque H.Kenn.
- Calathea asplundii H.Kenn.
- Calathea barryi H.Kenn.
- Calathea brenesii Standl.
- Calathea caesariata H.Kenn.
- Calathea calderon-saenzii H.Kenn. & M.Serna
- Calathea carlae H.Kenn.
- Calathea casupito (Jacq.) G.Mey.
- Calathea chiriquensis H.Kenn.
- Calathea cofaniorum H.Kenn.
- Calathea confusa H.Kenn.
- Calathea congesta H.Kenn.
- Calathea croatii H.Kenn.
- Calathea crotalifera S.Watson
- Calathea erythrolepis L.B.Sm. & Idrobo
- Calathea fredgandersii H.Kenn.
- Calathea fredii H.Kenn.
- Calathea galdamesiana H.Kenn. & Rod.Flores
- Calathea gentryi H.Kenn.
- Calathea grandifolia Lindl.
- Calathea guzmanioides L.B.Sm. & Idrobo
- Calathea hagbergii H.Kenn.
- Calathea harlingii H.Kenn.
- Calathea inscripta (W.Bull) N.E.Br.
- Calathea ischnosiphonoides H.Kenn.
- Calathea jondule H.Kenn. & Hammel
- Calathea lanibracteata H.Kenn.
- Calathea lanicaulis H.Kenn.
- Calathea lasiostachya Donn.Sm.
- Calathea lateralis (Ruiz & Pav.) Lindl.
- Calathea latrinotecta H.Kenn.
- Calathea lutea (Aubl.) E.Mey. ex Schult.
- Calathea marantina (Willd. ex Körn.) K.Koch
- Calathea monstera H.Kenn.
- Calathea multispicata H.Kenn. & M.Serna
- Calathea neillii H.Kenn.
- Calathea neurophylla H.Kenn.
- Calathea nitens (W.Bull) Ender
- Calathea oscariana H.Kenn.
- Calathea platystachya Standl. & L.O.Williams
- Calathea pluriplicata H.Kenn.
- Calathea plurispicata H.Kenn.
- Calathea ravenii H.Kenn.
- Calathea recurvata H.Kenn.
- Calathea retroflexa H.Kenn.
- Calathea rubribracteata H.Kenn.
- Calathea shishicoensis H.Kenn.
- Calathea similis H.Kenn.
- Calathea spiralis H.Kenn.
- Calathea striata H.Kenn.
- Calathea tarrazuensis H.Kenn.
- Calathea timothei H.Kenn.
- Calathea toroi S.Suárez
- Calathea trianae L.B.Sm. & Idrobo
- Calathea utilis H.Kenn.
- Calathea velutinifolia H.Kenn.
- Calathea verruculosa H.Kenn.
- Calathea yawankama H.Kenn.

== Media ==
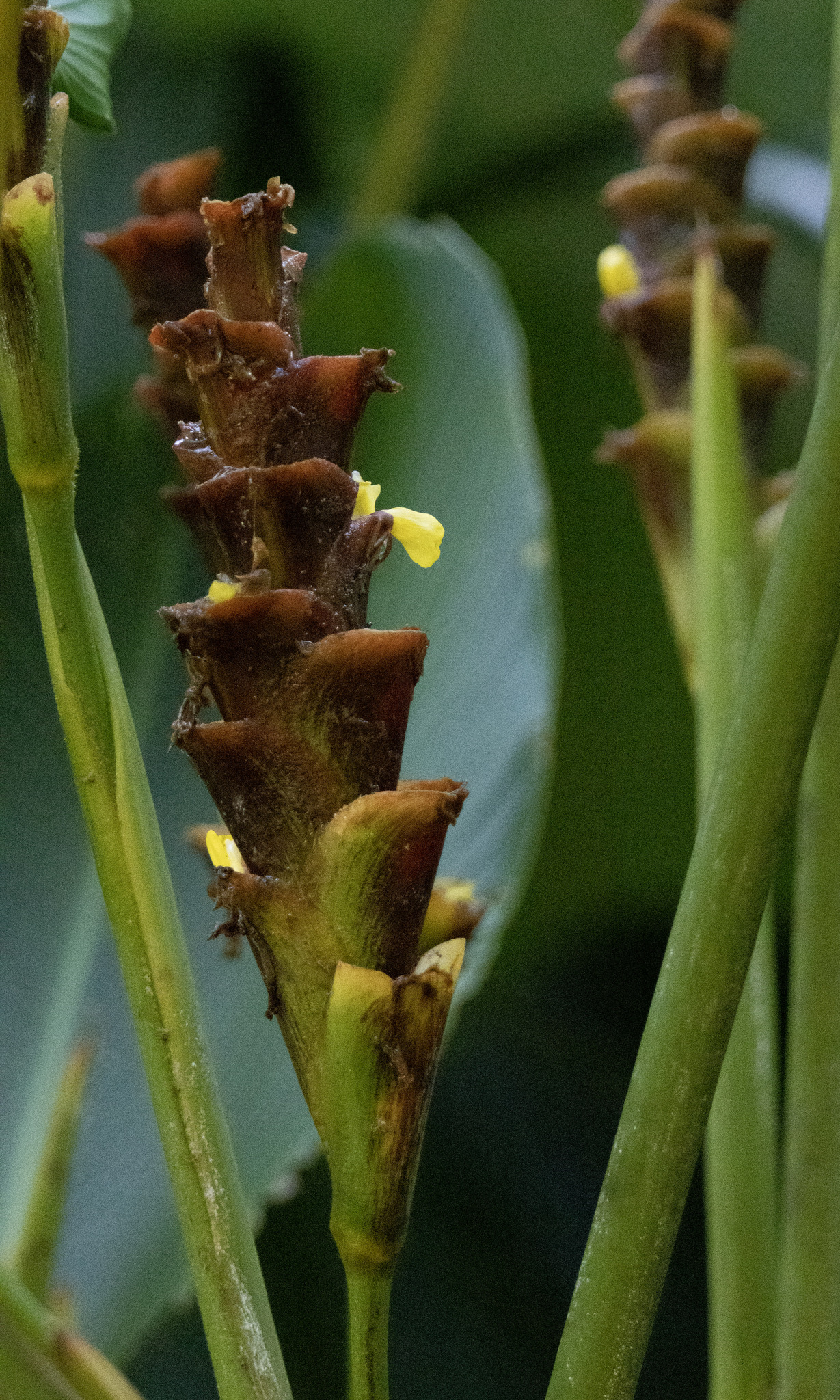
Calathea lutea inflorescence

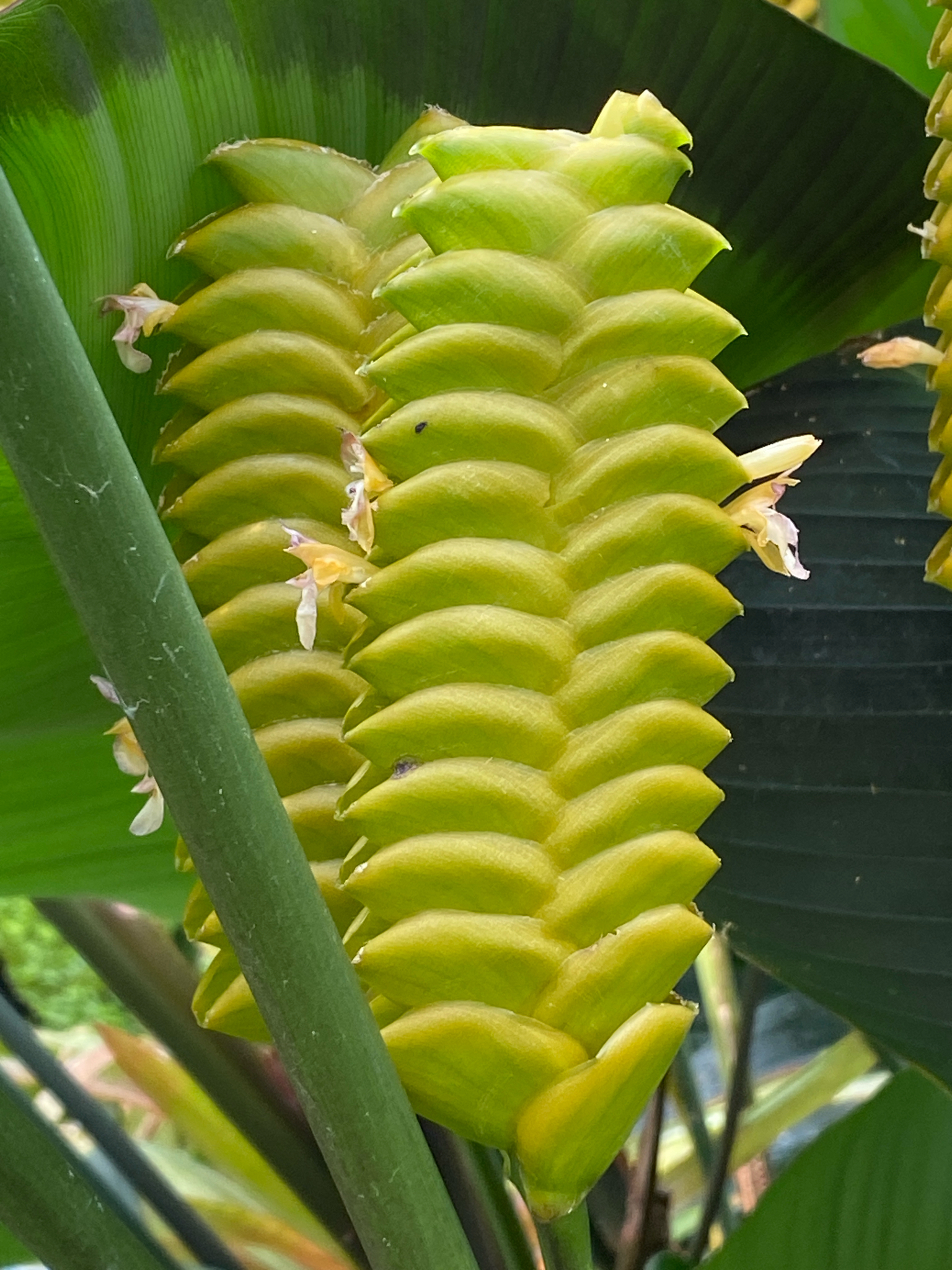
Calathea crotalifera inflroescence

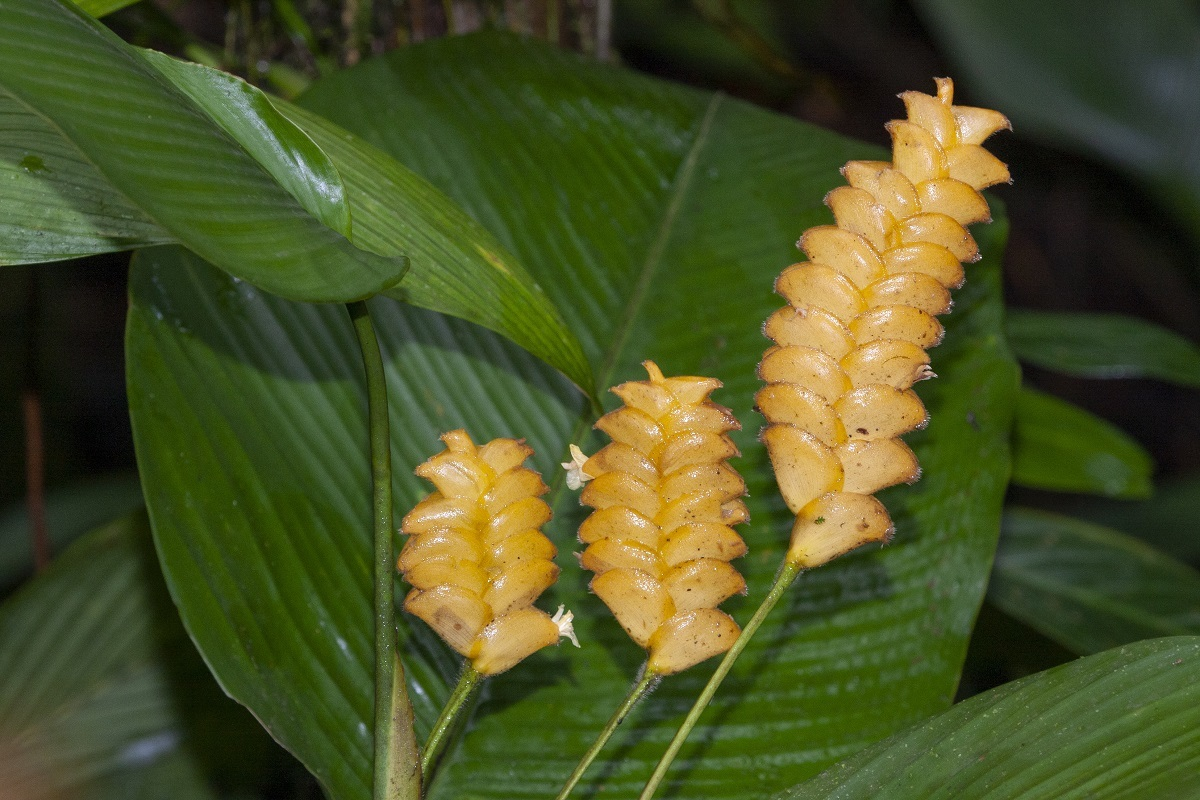
Calathea lasiostachya inflorescence

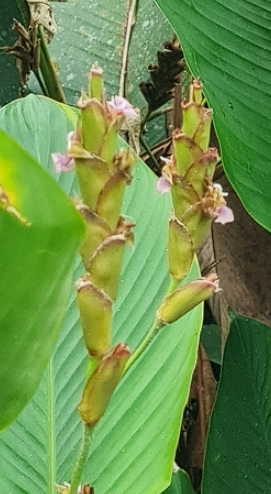
Calathea ischnosiphonoides inflorescence

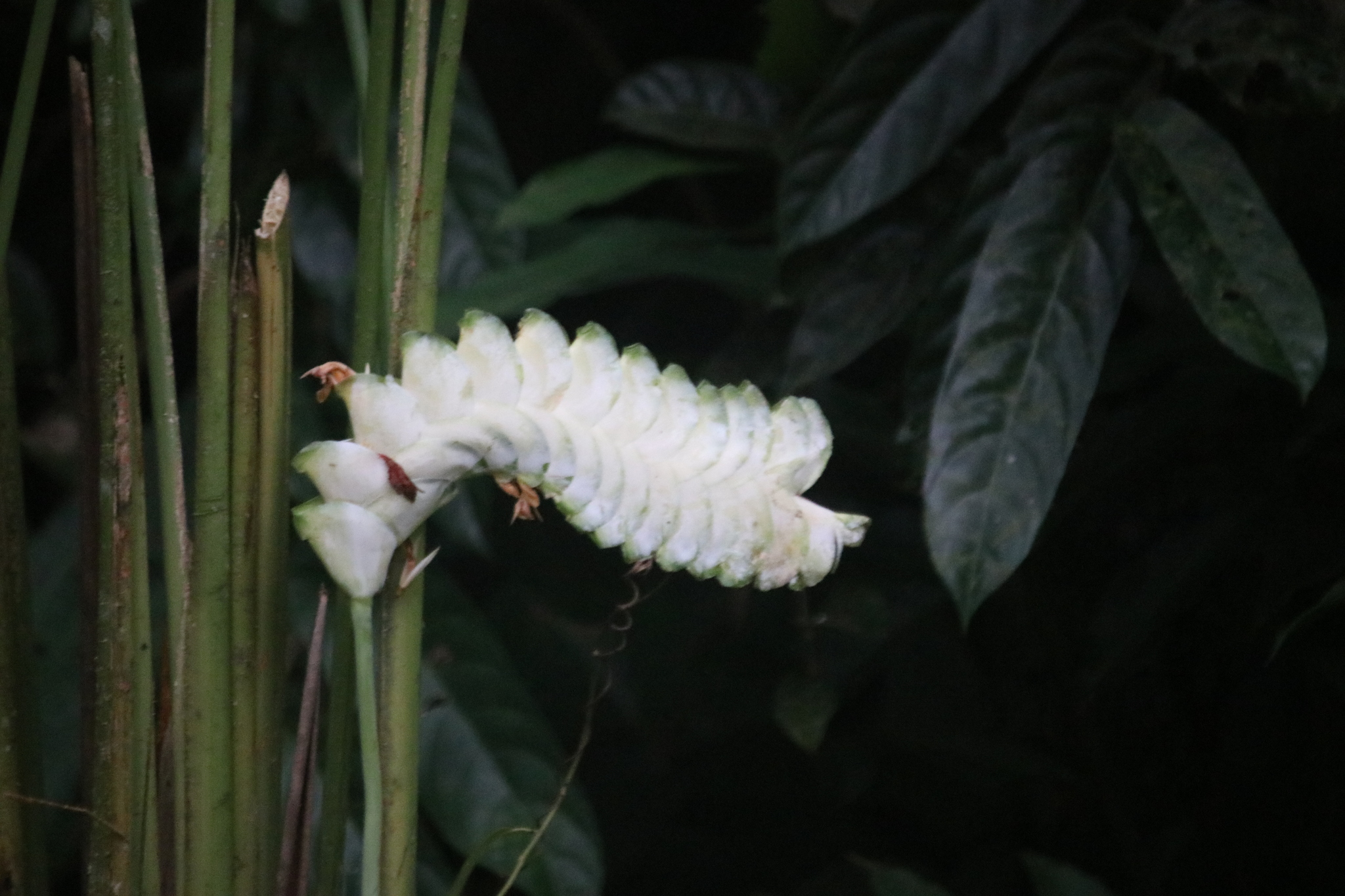
Calathea platystachya inflorescence

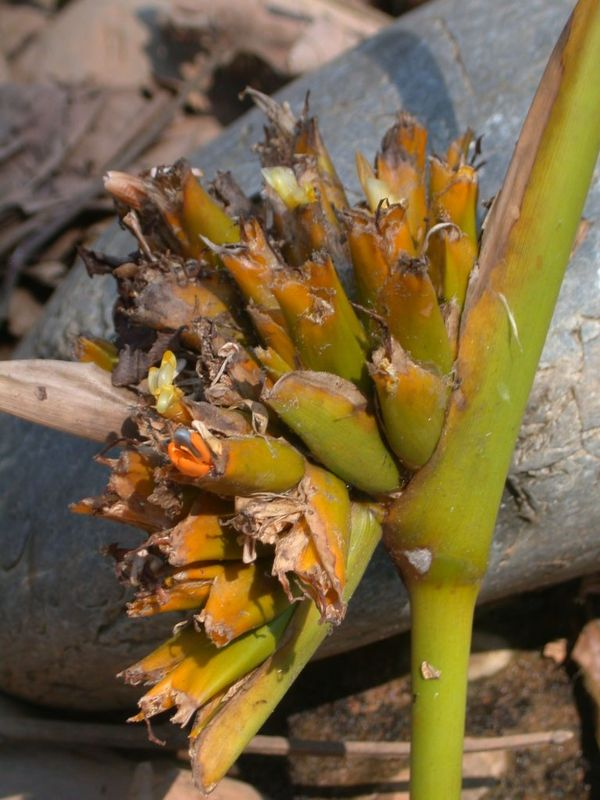
Calathea lateralis inflorescence

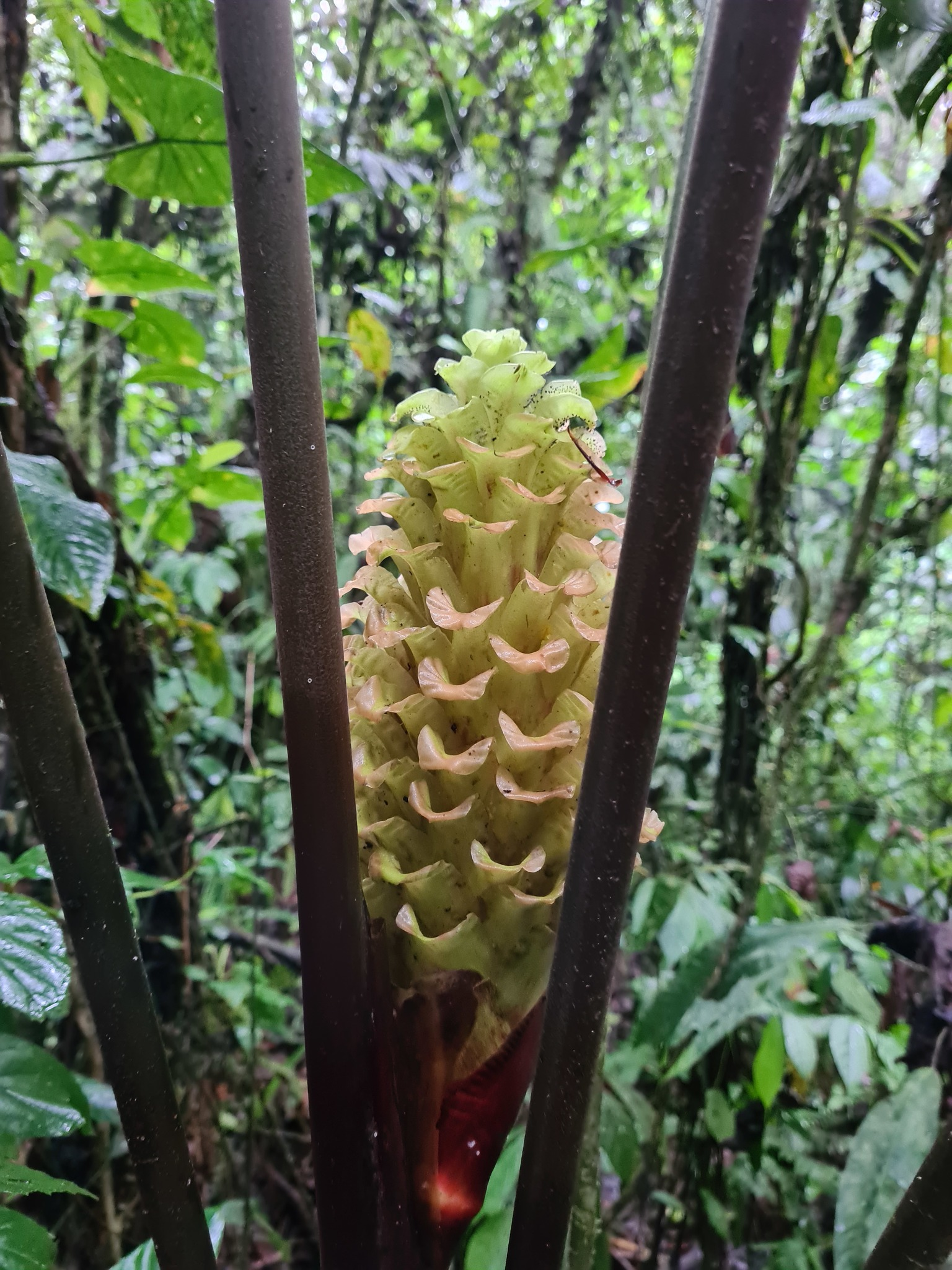
Calathea guzmanioides inflorescence

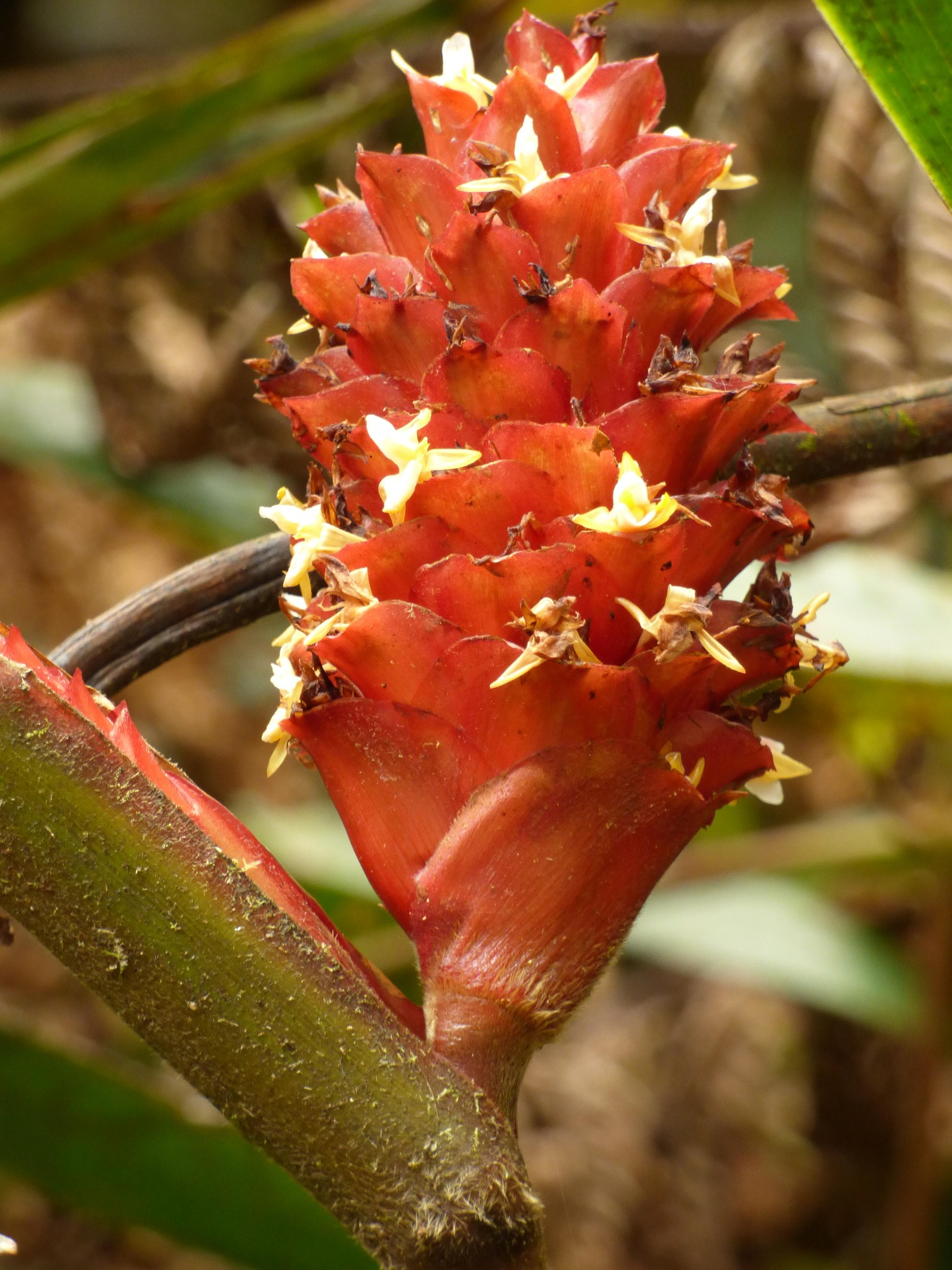
Calathea timothei inflorescence

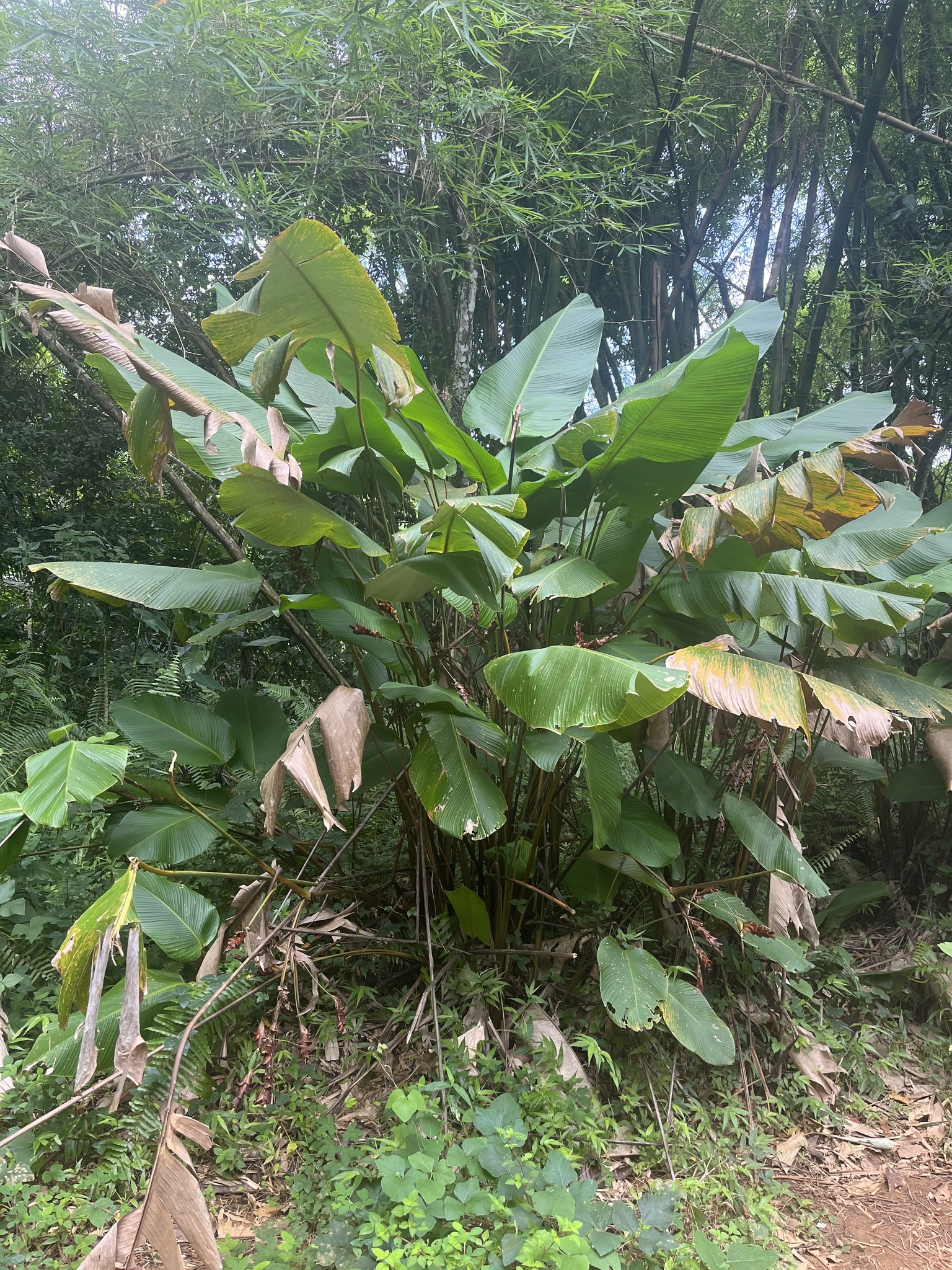
Calathea lutea leaves

== Native uses ==
In its native range, the large and tough leaves are popular for holding small items. Sometimes, they are used unprocessed, e.g. to wrap fish for transport in parts of Brazil, such as the Benevides region of Pará. In other places, the leaves are used in handicraft to produce containers, such as the quivers of the Nukak people of Colombia. Most famous, perhaps, are the decorative Calathea-leaf rice containers produced in some villages of Thailand, especially in Ban Huak (Amphoe Si Bun Rueang) where they are an important source of income and sold to locals and tourists alike.

Due to habitat destruction, several species are threatened with extinction.
