= Pulvinus =

Swollen or thickened leaf base

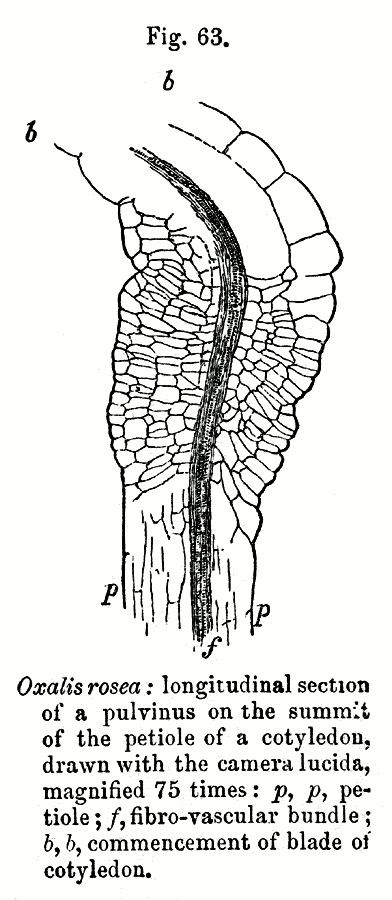
Section through the pulvinus of Oxalis rosea, from: Charles Darwin (1880): The Power of Movement in Plants.

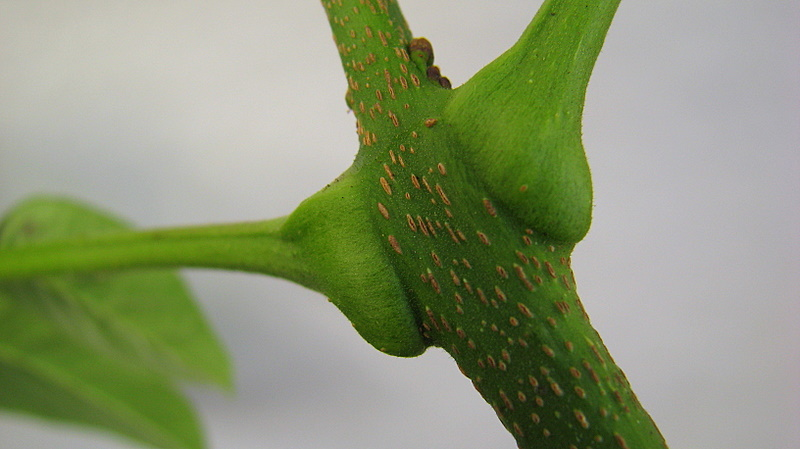
Pulvini of Jacaranda jasminoides

A pulvinus (pl. pulvini) may refer to a joint-like thickening at the base of a plant leaf or leaflet that facilitates growth-independent movement. Pulvinus is also a botanical term for the persistent peg-like bases of the leaves in the coniferous genera Picea and Tsuga. Pulvinar movement is common, for example, in members of the bean family Fabaceae (Leguminosae) and the prayer plant family Marantaceae.

Pulvini may be present at the base of the leaf stalk or on its other end (apex), where the leaf is attached, or in a compound leaf at the place where the leaflets are joined to its middle stem. They consist of a core of vascular tissue within a flexible, bulky cylinder of thin-walled parenchyma cells. A pulvinus is also sometimes called a geniculum (meaning a knee-like structure in Latin).

Pulvinar movement is caused by changes in turgor pressure leading to a contraction or expansion of the parenchyma tissue. The response is initiated when sucrose is unloaded from the phloem into the apoplast. The increased sugar concentration in the apoplast decreases the water potential and triggers the efflux of potassium ions from the surrounding cells. This is followed by an efflux of water, resulting in a sudden change of turgor pressure in the cells of the pulvinus. Aquaporins on the vacuole membrane of pulvini allow for the efflux of water that contributes to the change in turgor pressure. The process is similar to the mechanism of stomatal closure.

Common examples for pulvinar movements include the night closure movement of legume leaves and the touch response of the sensitive plant Mimosa pudica. Sleep movements (nyctinastic movements) are controlled by the circadian clock and light signal transduction through phytochrome. Touch response (thigmonastic) movements appear to be regulated through electrical and chemical signal transduction spreading the stimulus throughout the plant.

== Pulvinus in Mimosa pudica ==
In Mimosa pudica, the internal biological clock mediates the closing of leaflets at night and opening during day. Rapid (seismonastic) movement of leaves is triggered in response to touch and temperature.

A pulvinus is located at the base of each leaflet of the plant. Mechanical stimulation via touch is perceived and is translated to electrical stimulation causing the flow of ions out of the pulvinus cells. An upregulation of water channel proteins (aquaporins) and membrane proteins which move solutes across a cell membrane (H+ - ATPase) allows for the rapid flux of water out of these motor cells. Water flux out of the cell's symplast and into its surrounding apoplast results in a decrease in turgor pressure, and the characteristic closing of the leaves of Mimosa pudica. The drop in turgor pressure is reversible but slow. Leaves slowly open to their initial position after 20 minutes of lack of stimulation. It has been demonstrated that seismonastic movement can be inhibited with the use of anaesthetics.

Using nuclear magnetic resonance, upward movement of water within the pulvinus joint in response to electrical stimulation was observed in the pulvinus at the base of the petiole (=the leaf stalk). Movement of water to the upper or lower part of the pulvinus causes asymmetric swelling, therefore causing the stalk to either droop or rise.
