= Helen Kennedy (botanist) =

American botanist (born 1944)

Helen Kennedy (born 1944) is an American botanist, botanical collector, and expert of the Marantaceae family. Several taxa have been named after Kennedy, such as Amphitecna kennedyae (A.H.Gentry) and Spathiphyllum kennedyae Croat. In 2011, Kennedy received the Outstanding Achievement Award from the Society of Woman Geographers.

== Education ==
Kennedy was born in Riverside, California. She has a bachelor's degree in biology and a master's degree in botany from the University of California, Davis. She also has a doctoral degree from University of California.

== Career ==
Kennedy has worked at the Smithsonian Tropical Research Institute in Panama and has served as curator of the Summit Canal Zone Herbarium in Panama. She has also worked as Curator of the Summit Herbarium at the Missouri Botanical Garden. Kennedy has also worked for the University of Manitoba, Winnipeg and the Chicago Field Museum. As of 2007 she was an active collector for the University of British Columbia (UBC) herbarium, contributing 1,000 specimens since 1969. She has also been Honorary Curator of Vascular Plants at the UBC herbarium. As of 2016 she was herbarium research associate at the University of California at Riverside.

== Awards and recognition ==
In 2011, Kennedy received the Outstanding Achievement Award from the Society of Woman Geographers. Taxa named after Kennedy include Philodendron heleniae Croat and Guzmania kennedyae L.B. Sm. & Read.

== Selected publications ==
- Kennedy, Helen. "Diversification in pollination mechanisms in the Marantaceae." Monocots: systematics and evolution 2 (2000): 335-343.
- Kennedy, Helen. Systematics and pollination of the "closed-flowered" species of Calathea (Marantaceae). Vol. 71. Univ of California Press, 1978.
