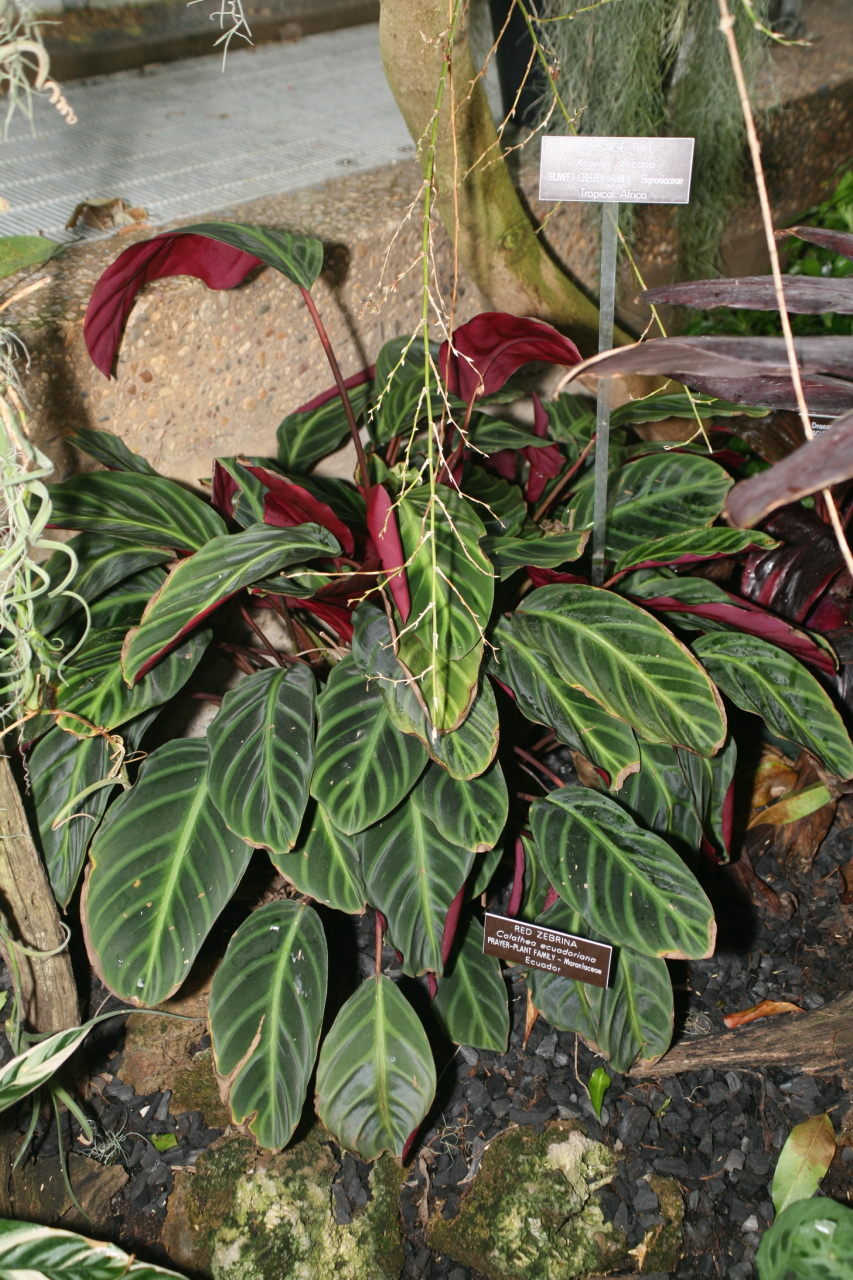

Conservation status
- Near Threatened (IUCN 3.1)

Scientific classification
- Kingdom: Plantae
- Clade: Embryophytes
- Clade: Tracheophytes
- Clade: Spermatophytes
- Clade: Angiosperms
- Clade: Monocots
- Clade: Commelinids
- Order: Zingiberales
- Family: Marantaceae
- Genus: Goeppertia
- Species: G. ecuadoriana

Binomial name
- Goeppertia ecuadoriana (H.Kenn.) Borchs. & S.Suárez

Synonyms
- Calathea ecuadoriana H.Kenn.

= Goeppertia ecuadoriana =

Species of flowering plant

Goeppertia ecuadoriana (syn. Calathea ecuadoriana) is a species of flowering plant in the Marantaceae family. It is endemic to Ecuador. Its natural habitats are subtropical or tropical moist lowland forests and subtropical or tropical moist montane forests.
