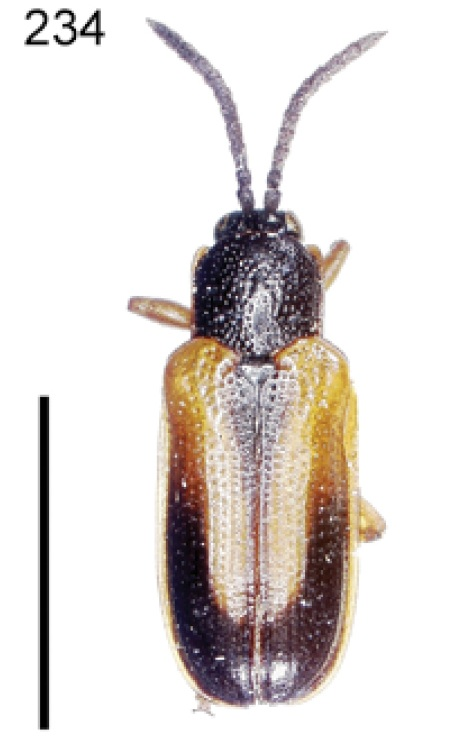

Scientific classification
- Kingdom: Animalia
- Phylum: Arthropoda
- Class: Insecta
- Order: Coleoptera
- Suborder: Polyphaga
- Infraorder: Cucujiformia
- Family: Chrysomelidae
- Genus: Cephaloleia
- Species: C. semivittata

Binomial name
- Cephaloleia semivittata Baly, 1885

= Cephaloleia semivittata =

Species of beetle

Cephaloleia semivittata is a species of beetle of the family Chrysomelidae. It is found in Costa Rica and Panama.

== Description ==
Adults reach a length of about 4.6–4.8 mm. The head, antennae, scutellum, pronotum (except the anterior margin and anterior angle which are margined in black) and venter are black. The elytron is reddish-yellow on the basal half, while the apical half has a black vitta from the lateral margin to the suture. The lateral margin is reddish-yellow.

== Biology ==
Adults have been collected on Calathea marantifolia, Cephaloleia cleistantha, Cephaloleia crotalifera and Pleiostachya pruinosa.
