= Goeppertia curaraya =

Conservation status
- Vulnerable (IUCN 3.1)

Scientific classification
- Kingdom: Plantae
- Clade: Embryophytes
- Clade: Tracheophytes
- Clade: Spermatophytes
- Clade: Angiosperms
- Clade: Monocots
- Clade: Commelinids
- Order: Zingiberales
- Family: Marantaceae
- Genus: Goeppertia
- Species: G. curaraya

Binomial name
- Goeppertia curaraya (H.Kenn.) Borchs. & S.Suárez

Synonyms
- Calathea curaraya H.Kenn.

Species of plant

Goeppertia curaraya (syn. Calathea curaraya) is a species of flowering plant in the Marantaceae family. It is native to Ecuador and Colombia. Its natural habitat is subtropical or tropical moist lowland forests.
