= Goeppertia micans =

Scientific classification
- Kingdom: Plantae
- Clade: Tracheophytes
- Clade: Angiosperms
- Clade: Monocots
- Clade: Commelinids
- Order: Zingiberales
- Family: Marantaceae
- Genus: Goeppertia
- Species: G. micans

Binomial name
- Goeppertia micans (L.Mathieu) Borchs. & S.Suárez

Synonyms
- Calathea micans (L.Mathieu) Körn.; Maranta micans L.Mathieu; Phrynium micans (L.Mathieu) Klotzsch; Phyllodes micans (L.Mathieu) Kuntze

Species of flowering plant

Goeppertia micans is a species of plant in the family Marantaceae. Its native range is Mexico to Tropical South America. Goeppertia micans is similar in appearance to Goeppertia fucata; however, G. micans is taller and does not have variegated leaves.

The Ngäbe-Buglé people use it in traditional medicine. In Oaxaca, Mexico, where it is known as beliján, Goeppertia micans is used for domestic and medicinal purposes.
