= Goeppertia gandersii =

Conservation status
- Vulnerable (IUCN 3.1)

Scientific classification
- Kingdom: Plantae
- Clade: Embryophytes
- Clade: Tracheophytes
- Clade: Spermatophytes
- Clade: Angiosperms
- Clade: Monocots
- Clade: Commelinids
- Order: Zingiberales
- Family: Marantaceae
- Genus: Goeppertia
- Species: G. gandersii

Binomial name
- Goeppertia gandersii (H.Kenn.) Borchs. & S.Suárez

Synonyms
- Calathea gandersii H.Kenn.

Species of flowering plant

Goeppertia gandersii (syn. Calathea gandersii) is a species of flowering plant in the Marantaceae family. It is endemic to Napo Province of Ecuador. Its natural habitats are subtropical or tropical moist lowland forests and subtropical or tropical moist montane forests.
