= Goeppertia petersenii =

Conservation status
- Critically Endangered (IUCN 3.1)

Scientific classification
- Kingdom: Plantae
- Clade: Embryophytes
- Clade: Tracheophytes
- Clade: Spermatophytes
- Clade: Angiosperms
- Clade: Monocots
- Clade: Commelinids
- Order: Zingiberales
- Family: Marantaceae
- Genus: Goeppertia
- Species: G. petersenii

Binomial name
- Goeppertia petersenii (Eggers) Borchs. & S.Suárez

Synonyms
- Calathea petersenii Eggers

Species of flowering plant

Goeppertia petersenii is a species of plant in the Marantaceae family. It is native to southeastern Colombia and Ecuador. Its natural habitat is tropical moist lowland forests up to 500 meters elevation.

The species was first described as Calathea petersenii by Henrik Franz Alexander von Eggers in 1893. In 2012 Finn Borchsenius and Stella Suárez placed the species in genus Goeppertia as G. petersenii.
