= Goeppertia elegans =

Scientific classification
- Kingdom: Plantae
- Clade: Embryophytes
- Clade: Tracheophytes
- Clade: Spermatophytes
- Clade: Angiosperms
- Clade: Monocots
- Clade: Commelinids
- Order: Zingiberales
- Family: Marantaceae
- Genus: Goeppertia
- Species: G. elegans

Binomial name
- Goeppertia elegans (H.Kenn.) Borchs. & S.Suárez

Synonyms
- Calathea elegans H.Kenn.

Species of plant

Goeppertia elegans (syn. Calathea elegans) is a plant species belonging to the family Marantaceae native to Colombia and Panama. It resembles Goeppertia cuneata.
