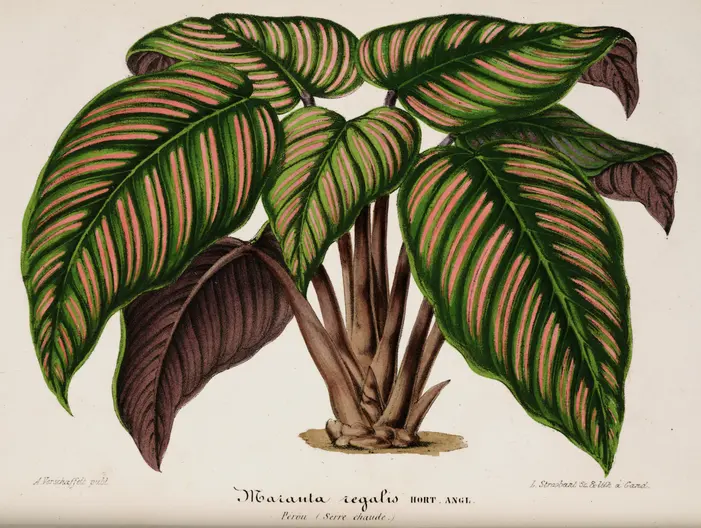

Scientific classification
- Kingdom: Plantae
- Clade: Tracheophytes
- Clade: Angiosperms
- Clade: Monocots
- Clade: Commelinids
- Order: Zingiberales
- Family: Marantaceae
- Genus: Goeppertia
- Species: G. regalis

Binomial name
- Goeppertia regalis (Rollison ex Lem.) Borchs. & S.Suárez

Synonyms
- Calathea ornata var. regalis (Rollison ex Lem.) Körn.; Calathea regalis (Rollison ex Lem.) H.Kenn.; Maranta regalis Rollison ex Lem.

= Goeppertia regalis =

Species of plant

Goeppertia regalis is a species of plant from the genus Goeppertia in the Marantaceae family. It is endemic to Peru, more precisely from the departments of Huánuco and Loreto. It belongs to the sub-group of Goeppertia called the Ornata clade.

== Description ==
Goeppertia regalis has dark green leaves with a striped pattern of pink lines above the leaf. The undersides are purple. The species goes through a pattern change when maturing, where the pink lines get surrounded by a light green area. Later on the stripes fade entirely and only the two light green bands remain, which is called the brush pattern. When mature the leaves are plain green, both above and under. The inflorescence is unknown.
