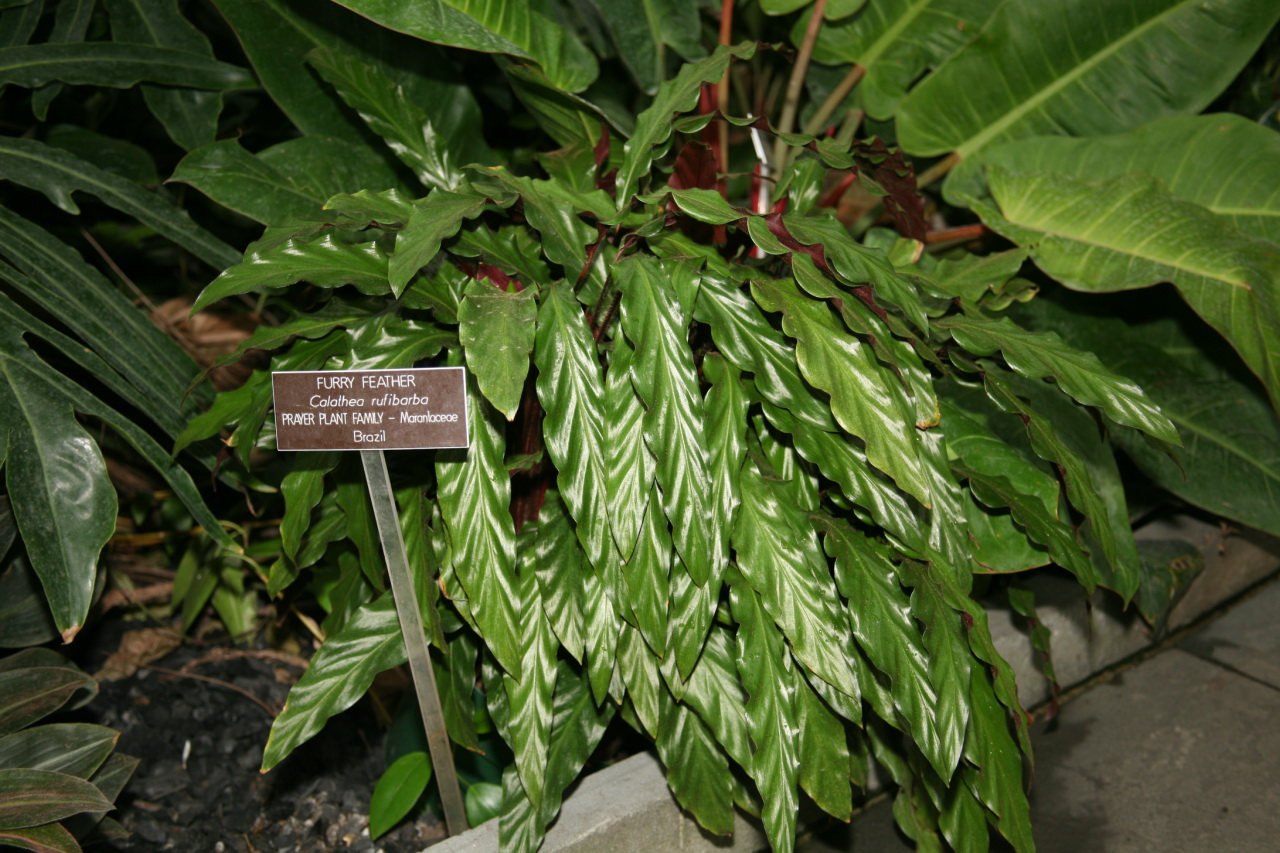
- At the United States Botanic Garden

Scientific classification
- Kingdom: Plantae
- Clade: Embryophytes
- Clade: Tracheophytes
- Clade: Spermatophytes
- Clade: Angiosperms
- Clade: Monocots
- Clade: Commelinids
- Order: Zingiberales
- Family: Marantaceae
- Genus: Goeppertia
- Species: G. rufibarba

Binomial name
- Goeppertia rufibarba (Fenzl) Borchs. & S.Suárez

Synonyms
- Calathea rufibarba Fenzl; Phyllodes rufibarba (Fenzl) Kuntze

= Goeppertia rufibarba =

Species of flowering plant

Goeppertia rufibarba (syn. Calathea rufibarba), the furry feather or velvet calathea, is a species of flowering plant in the Marantaceae family, native to Bahia state of northeastern Brazil. The plant's common names are due to its fuzzy, fur-like underleaf texture, which is unusual in its genus. Furthermore, the specific epithet rufibarba comes from the Latin rufus 'red' and barba 'beard'.

Common as a houseplant, the species requires warm temperatures, shade, and humidity to thrive, and may produce small yellow flowers. It has gained the Royal Horticultural Society's Award of Garden Merit.
