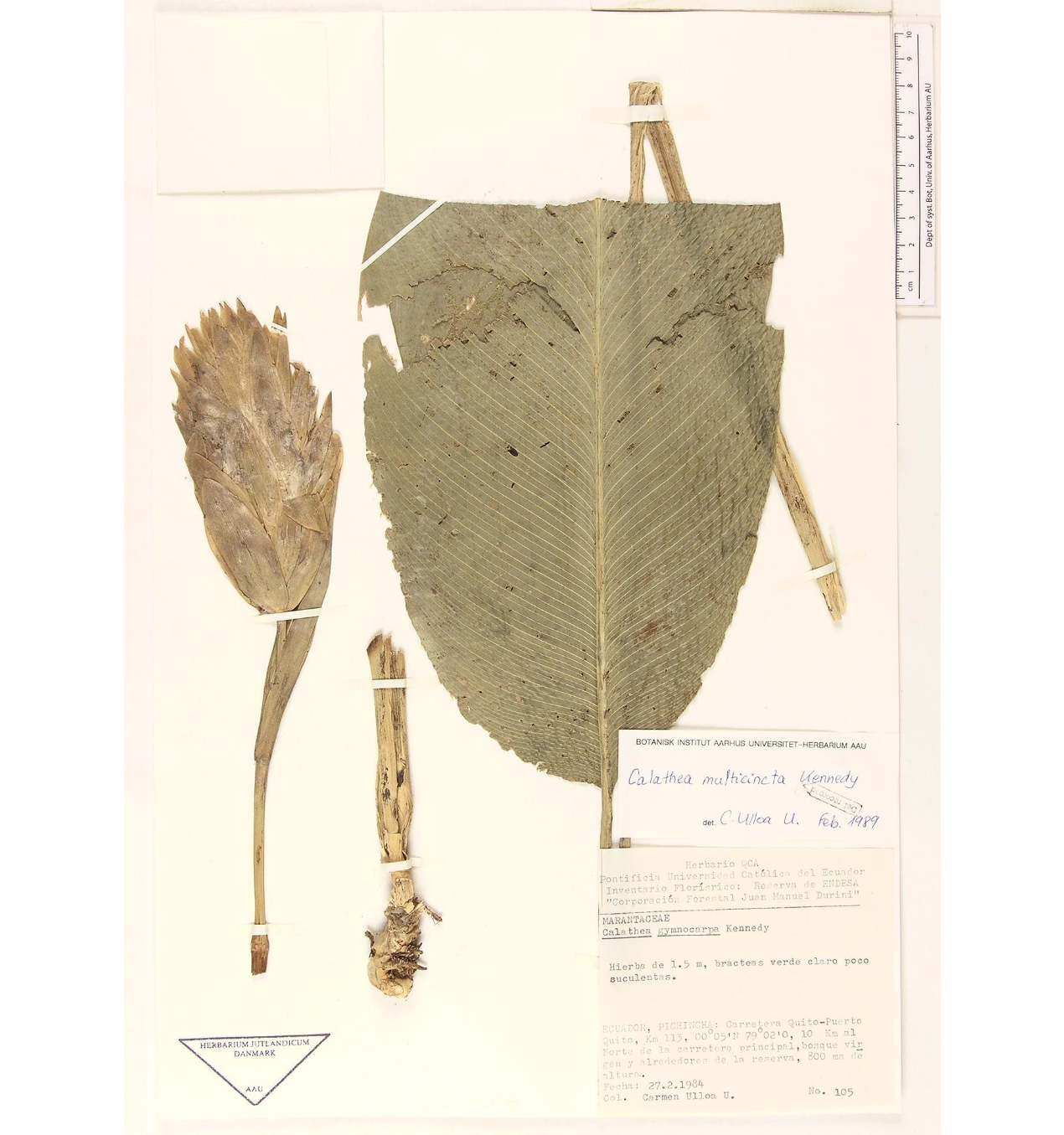

Conservation status
- Vulnerable (IUCN 3.1)

Scientific classification
- Kingdom: Plantae
- Clade: Tracheophytes
- Clade: Angiosperms
- Clade: Monocots
- Clade: Commelinids
- Order: Zingiberales
- Family: Marantaceae
- Genus: Goeppertia
- Species: G. multicincta

Binomial name
- Goeppertia multicincta (H.Kenn.) Borchs. & S.Suárez

Synonyms
- Calathea multicincta H.Kenn.

= Goeppertia multicincta =

Species of plant

Goeppertia multicincta is a species of plant from the genus Goeppertia in the Marantaceae family. It is native to Colombia and Ecuador, around Santo Domingo. It belongs to the sub-group of Goeppertia called the Ornata clade.

== Description ==
Goeppertia multicincta is a medium sized plant (around 1 meter when mature) with huge, ovale green leaves, with thick, short green petioles and a long pulvinus. The juvenile leaves often have a striped pattern above the leaf with white lines. They usually disappear with maturity and become plain green except for a few specimen that do retain the lines. This makes the species part of the Ornata group. The inflorescence of Goeppertia multicincta is very similar to Goeppertia gymnocarpa, made of multiple bracts around a short green peduncle. The bracts are green, long and ovale and soon dying off. The flowers are big, with white cream petals and yellow and purple staminodes. The fruiting period is also very similar to G.gymnocarpa, with only red or orange fruits capsule remaining on the peduncle.
