= Goeppertia mediopicta =

Scientific classification
- Kingdom: Plantae
- Clade: Embryophytes
- Clade: Tracheophytes
- Clade: Spermatophytes
- Clade: Angiosperms
- Clade: Monocots
- Clade: Commelinids
- Order: Zingiberales
- Family: Marantaceae
- Genus: Goeppertia
- Species: G. mediopicta

Binomial name
- Goeppertia mediopicta (Jacob-Makoy ex É.Morren) Borchs. & S.Suárez

Synonyms
- Calathea mediopicta Jacob-Makoy ex É.Morren; Calathea prasina (W.Bull) N.E.Br.; Maranta mediopicta (Jacob-Makoy ex É.Morren) É.Morren; Maranta prasina W.Bull; Phyllodes mediopicta (Jacob-Makoy ex É.Morren) Kuntze

Species of flowering plant

Goeppertia mediopicta (syn. Calathea mediopicta), the middle-stripe prayer plant, is a species of flowering plant in the family Marantaceae, native to Espírito Santo state in southeastern Brazil. The specific epithet mediopicta means having a stripe or color down the middle. Goeppertia mediopicta has gained the Royal Horticultural Society's Award of Garden Merit.
