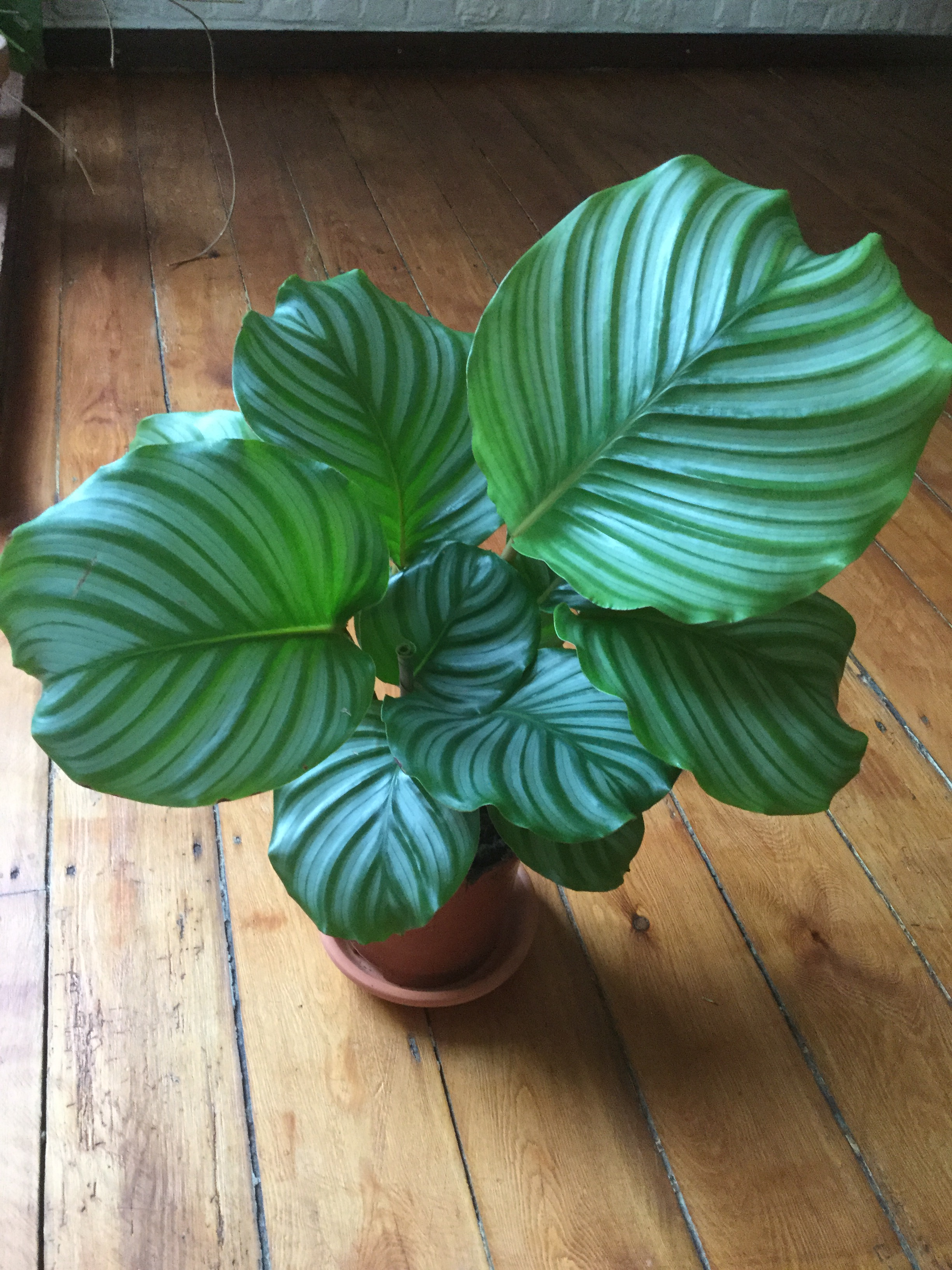
- A Goeppertia orbifolia plant on a wooden floor

Scientific classification
- Kingdom: Plantae
- Clade: Embryophytes
- Clade: Tracheophytes
- Clade: Spermatophytes
- Clade: Angiosperms
- Clade: Monocots
- Clade: Commelinids
- Order: Zingiberales
- Family: Marantaceae
- Genus: Goeppertia
- Species: G. orbifolia

Binomial name
- Goeppertia orbifolia (Linden) Borchs. & S.Suárez

Synonyms
- Calathea orbifolia (Linden) H.Kenn.; Maranta orbifolia Linden; Calathea rotundifolia (K.Koch ex Horan.) Körn.; Maranta rotundifolia Körn.; Phyllodes rotundifolia (K.Koch ex Horan.) Kuntze; Thalia rotundifolia K.Koch ex Horan.

= Goeppertia orbifolia =

Species of flowering plant

Goeppertia orbifolia is a species of flowering plant in the family Marantaceae. This prayer plant is sometimes known by its synonym Calathea orbifolia. It is endemic to Brazil, being a typical species of the Atlantic Forest. It is commonly kept as a houseplant in temperate zones for its ornamental leaves. It requires partial shade, humidity, and good drainage to thrive.
