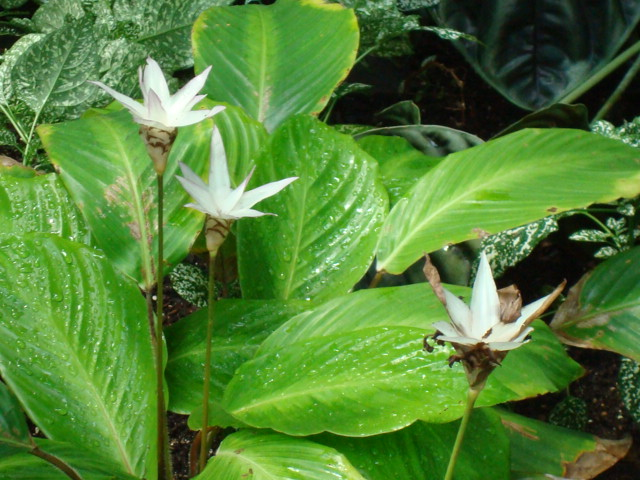

Scientific classification
- Kingdom: Plantae
- Clade: Embryophytes
- Clade: Tracheophytes
- Clade: Spermatophytes
- Clade: Angiosperms
- Clade: Monocots
- Clade: Commelinids
- Order: Zingiberales
- Family: Marantaceae
- Genus: Goeppertia
- Species: G. loeseneri

Binomial name
- Goeppertia loeseneri (J.F.MacBr.) Borchs. & S.Suárez

Synonyms
- Calathea loeseneri J.F.Macbr.

= Goeppertia loeseneri =

Species of plant

Goeppertia loeseneri (syn. Calathea loeseneri), the Brazilian star calathea, is a species of plant belonging to the Marantaceae family. It is native to Peru, northern Brazil, Colombia, and Ecuador. It can grow to a height of 1.2m (4 feet).

Goeppertia loeseneri is widely cultivated as an ornamental plant with star-shaped pink flowers outside its native range.
