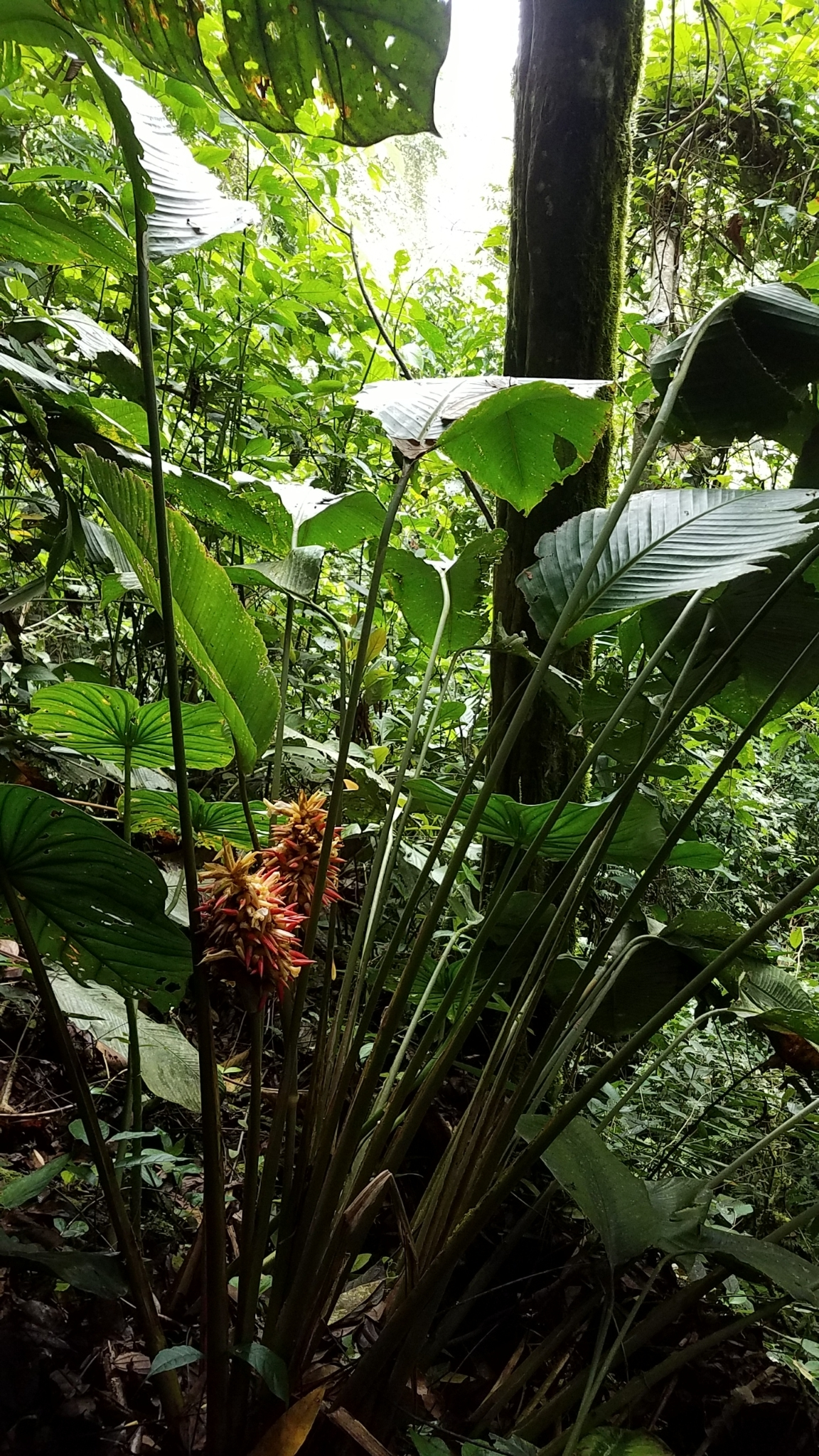

Scientific classification
- Kingdom: Plantae
- Clade: Tracheophytes
- Clade: Angiosperms
- Clade: Monocots
- Clade: Commelinids
- Order: Zingiberales
- Family: Marantaceae
- Genus: Goeppertia
- Species: G. pachystachya

Binomial name
- Goeppertia pachystachya (Poepp. & Endl.) Borchs. & S.Suárez

Synonyms
- Calathea pachystachya (Poepp. & Endl.) Körn.; Phrynium pachystachyum Poepp. & Endl.; Phyllodes pachystachya (Poepp. & Endl.) Kuntze; Calathea aberrans Huber; Calathea sodiroi Eggers

= Goeppertia pachystachya =

Species of plant

Goeppertia pachystachya is a species of plant from the genus Goeppertia in the Marantaceae family. It is native to Bolivia, Ecuador and Peru. It belongs to the sub-group of Goeppertia called the Ornata clade.

== Description ==
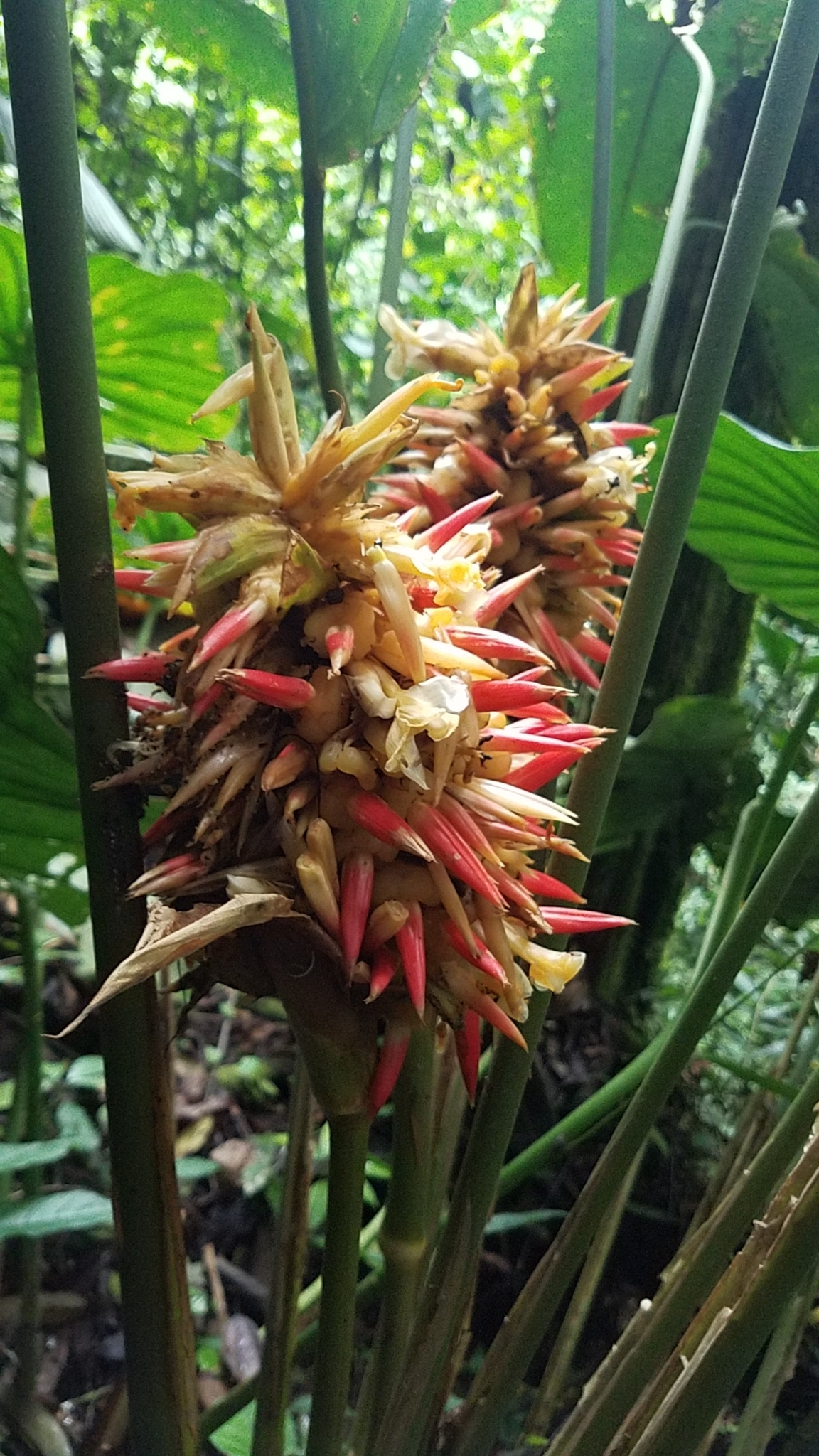
Inflorescence of Goeppertia pachystachya

Goeppertia pachystachya is a tall plant (around 2 meters when mature) with huge, ovale green leaves, thick, long green petioles and a long pulvinus. The leaves are usually plain green but it can develop a brush pattern above which consists of two, yellowish green bands on each side of the leaf, which makes it part of the Ornata group. The inflorescence of G.pachystachya is made of multiple bracts spirally arranged around a thick, green peduncle. The bracts are spiky, green with yellow tips. The flowers are pretty big with white creamy petals and staminodes. The fruiting period is what makes this species easy to identify with its white green and bright red fruit capsule.
