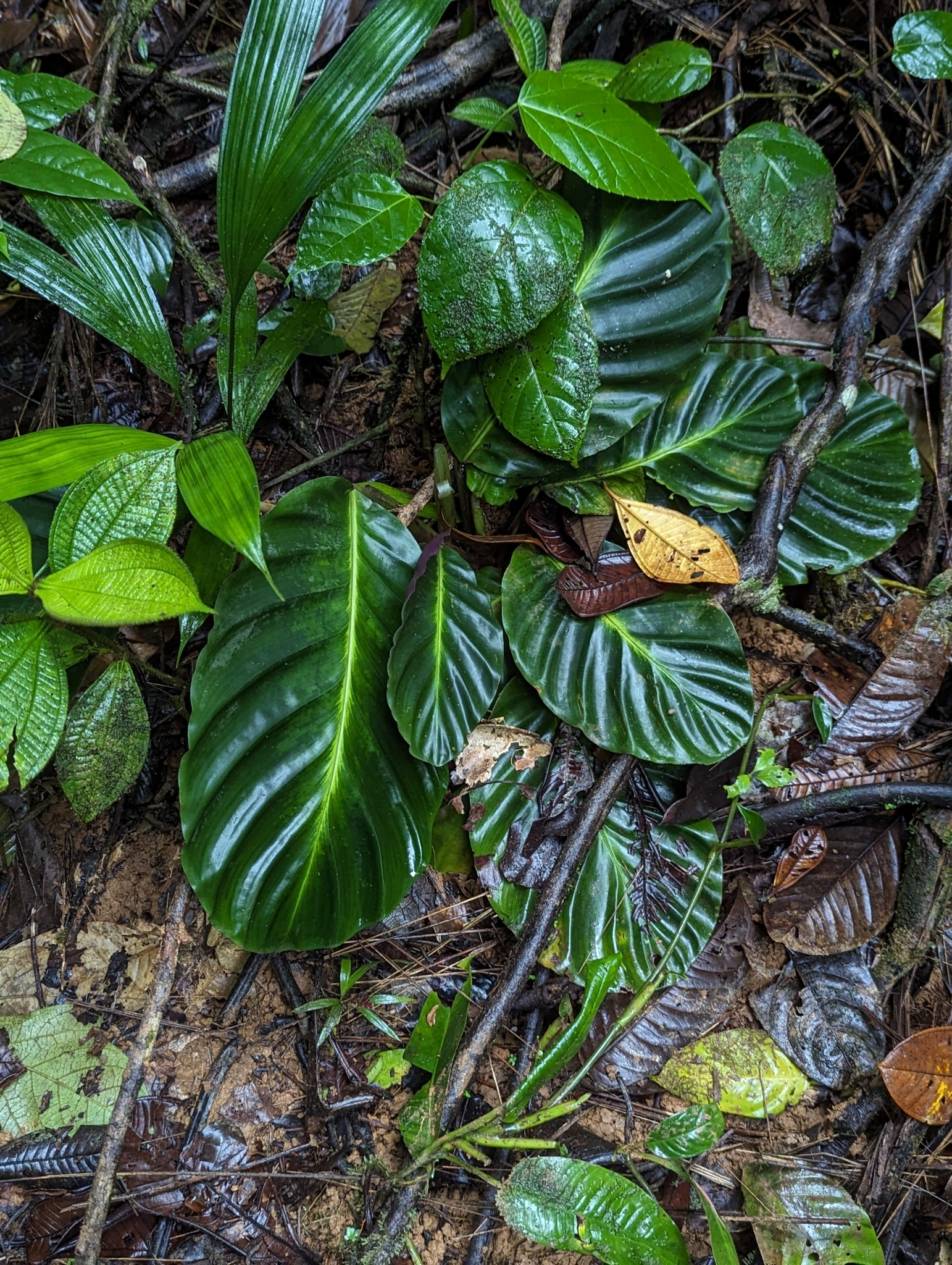

Scientific classification
- Kingdom: Plantae
- Clade: Embryophytes
- Clade: Tracheophytes
- Clade: Spermatophytes
- Clade: Angiosperms
- Clade: Monocots
- Clade: Commelinids
- Order: Zingiberales
- Family: Marantaceae
- Genus: Goeppertia
- Species: G. dressleri

Binomial name
- Goeppertia dressleri (H.Kenn.) Borchs. & S.Suárez

Synonyms
- Calathea dressleri H.Kenn.

= Goeppertia dressleri =

Species of plant

Goeppertia dressleri is a species of plant from the genus Goeppertia in the Marantaceae family. It is native to Colombia and Panamá.

== Description ==
Goeppertia dressleri is a small sized plants with wide, ovale, dark green velvety leaves, short and thick petioles and a very short pulvinus. It usually have a thin light green middle vein and can sometimes become a thin band a few milimeters from each sides of the middle vein. The inflorescence of G.dressleri is made of multiple bracts around a short and thick peduncle. The bracts are white and the flowers are white with a soft purple blush.
