= Goeppertia dodsonii =

Conservation status
- Critically Endangered (IUCN 3.1)

Scientific classification
- Kingdom: Plantae
- Clade: Embryophytes
- Clade: Tracheophytes
- Clade: Spermatophytes
- Clade: Angiosperms
- Clade: Monocots
- Clade: Commelinids
- Order: Zingiberales
- Family: Marantaceae
- Genus: Goeppertia
- Species: G. dodsonii

Binomial name
- Goeppertia dodsonii (H.Kenn.) Borchs. & S.Suárez

Synonyms
- Calathea ecuadoriana H.Kenn.

Species of flowering plant

Goeppertia dodsonii (syn. Calathea dodsonii) is a species of flowering plant in the Marantaceae family. It is endemic to Ecuador. Its natural habitat is subtropical or tropical moist lowland forests.
