= Goeppertia libbyana =

Conservation status
- Endangered (IUCN 3.1)

Scientific classification
- Kingdom: Plantae
- Clade: Tracheophytes
- Clade: Angiosperms
- Clade: Monocots
- Clade: Commelinids
- Order: Zingiberales
- Family: Marantaceae
- Genus: Goeppertia
- Species: G. libbyana

Binomial name
- Goeppertia libbyana (H.Kenn.) Borchs. & S.Suárez

Synonyms
- Calathea libbyana H.Kenn.

Species of flowering plant

Goeppertia libbyana (syn. Calathea libbyana) is an endangered species of flowering plant in the family Marantaceae, endemic to Napo Province of Ecuador. Its natural habitat is subtropical or tropical moist lowland forests. It has gained the Royal Horticultural Society's Award of Garden Merit.
