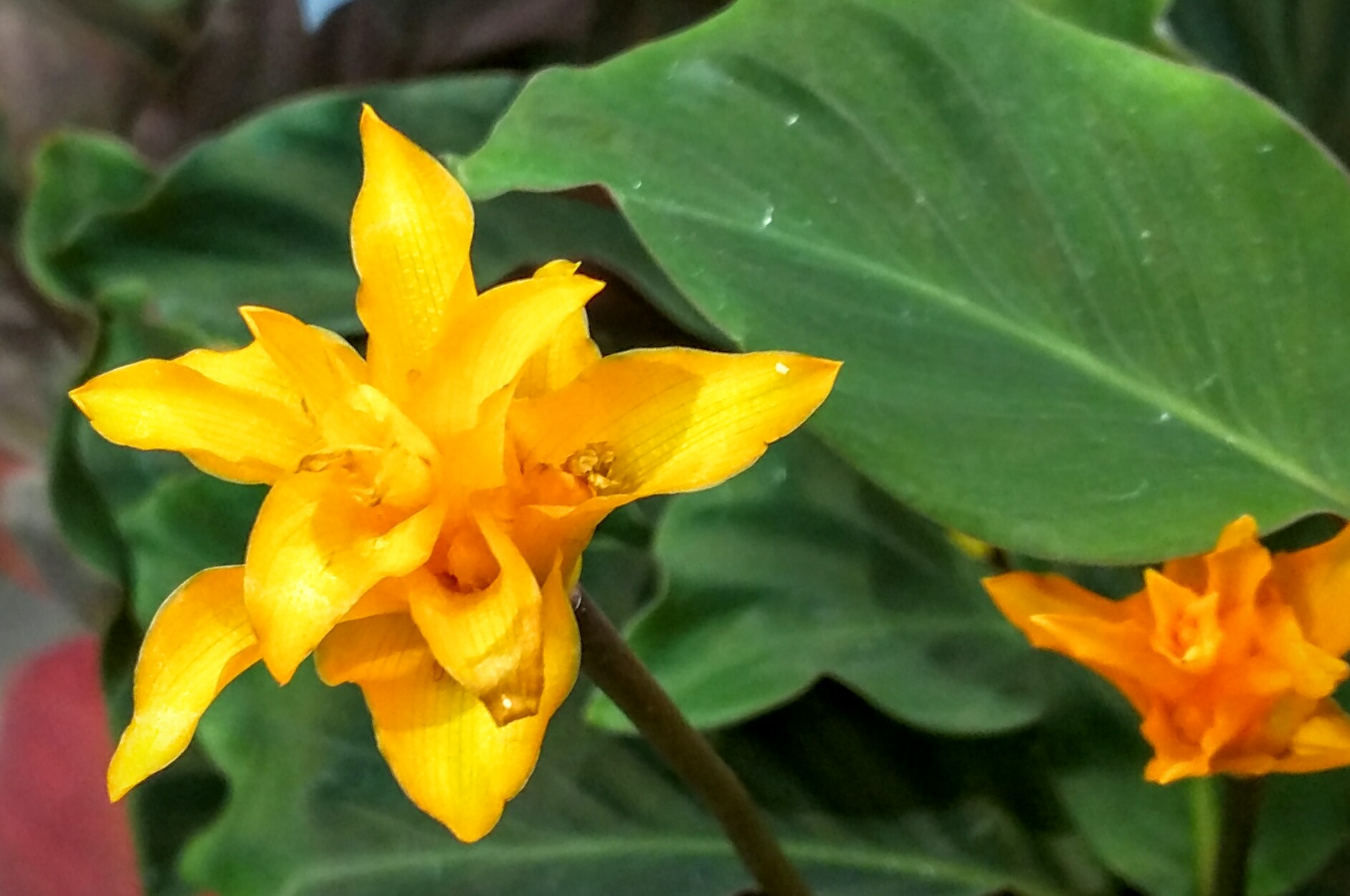
- Flower
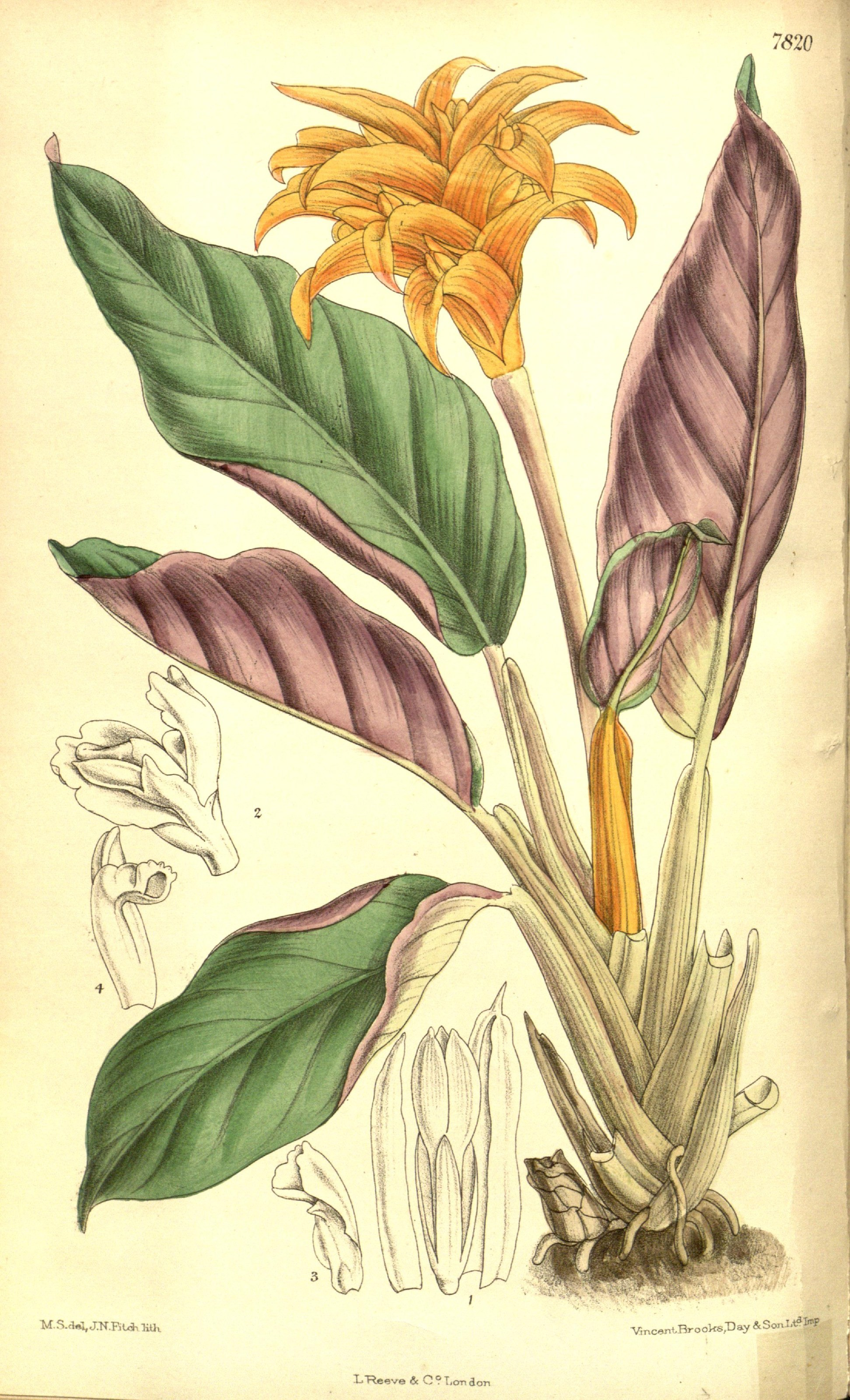
- Botanical illustration

Scientific classification
- Kingdom: Plantae
- Clade: Embryophytes
- Clade: Tracheophytes
- Clade: Spermatophytes
- Clade: Angiosperms
- Clade: Monocots
- Clade: Commelinids
- Order: Zingiberales
- Family: Marantaceae
- Genus: Goeppertia
- Species: G. crocata

Binomial name
- Goeppertia crocata (É.Morren & Joriss.) Borchs. & S.Suárez

Synonyms
- Calathea crocata É.Morren & Joriss.; Phyllodes crocata (É.Morren & Joriss.) Kuntze

= Goeppertia crocata =

Species of flowering plant

Goeppertia crocata (syn. Calathea crocata), the saffron-coloured calathea or eternal flame plant, is a species of flowering plant in the family Marantaceae, native to Bahia and Espírito Santo states of eastern Brazil. It has gained the Royal Horticultural Society's Award of Garden Merit as a hothouse ornamental.

== Description ==
G. crocata is prized for its "hot", yellow-orange flowers. The flower stems are straight and slightly taller than the leaves, making the flowers more prominent.
