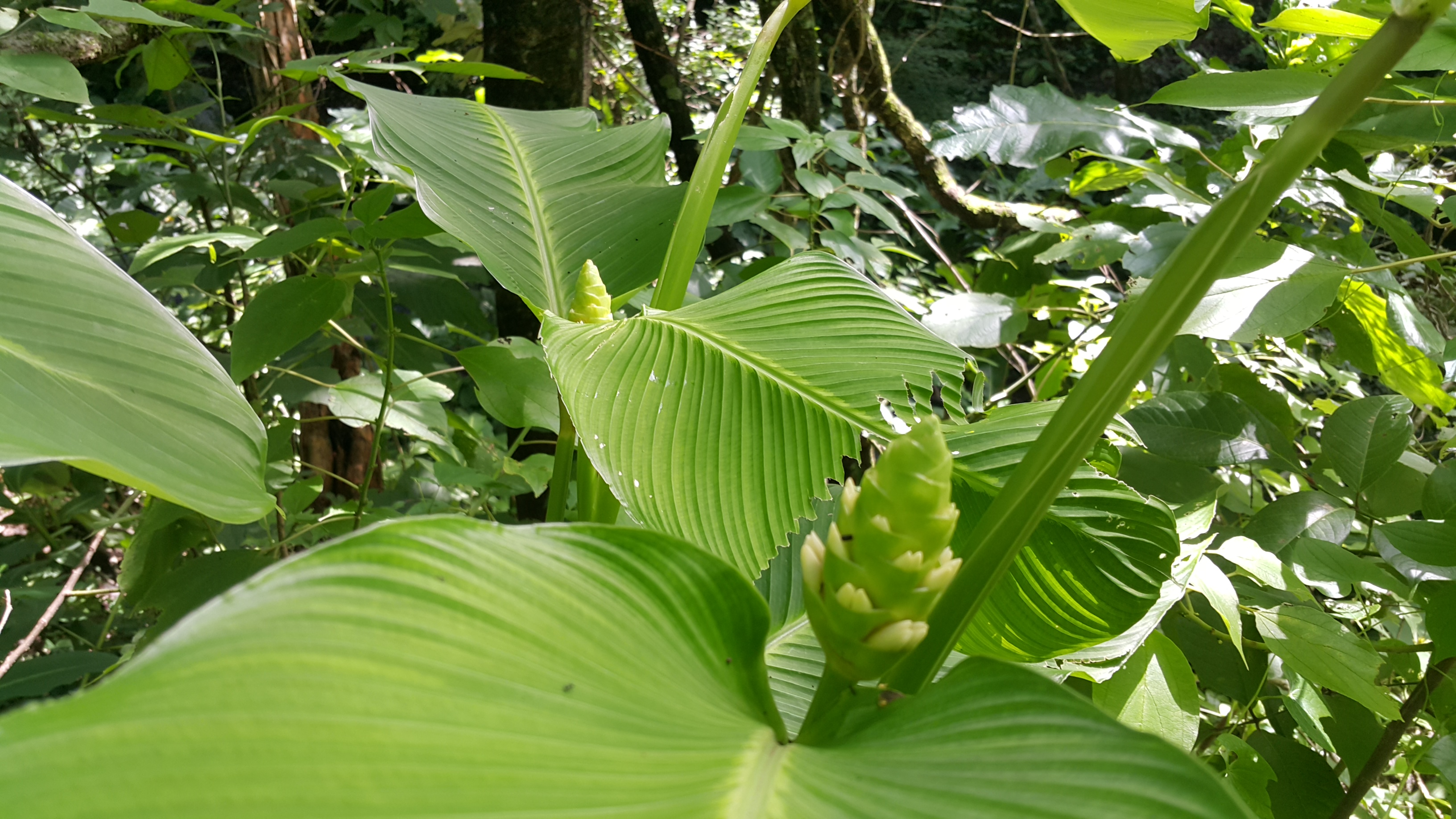

Scientific classification
- Kingdom: Plantae
- Clade: Embryophytes
- Clade: Tracheophytes
- Clade: Spermatophytes
- Clade: Angiosperms
- Clade: Monocots
- Clade: Commelinids
- Order: Zingiberales
- Family: Marantaceae
- Genus: Goeppertia
- Species: G. macrosepala

Binomial name
- Goeppertia macrosepala (K.Schum.) Borchs. & S.Suárez

Synonyms
- Calathea macrosepala K.Schum.

= Goeppertia macrosepala =

Species of flowering plant

Goeppertia macrosepala, known as chufle or macús, is a species of plant in the family Marantaceae. Other local names include k'uut and xucu. The native range of Goeppertia macrosepala is southern Mexico to western Colombia and Trinidad.

Goeppertia macrosepala is used as food. The immature (closed) inflorescences are eaten in El Salvador and have been approved for importation to the United States. In El Salvador the root of Goeppertia macrosepala is used for treating diabetes.

Goeppertia macrosepala has sometimes been confused with Goeppertia allouia, but the native ranges of these two plants do not overlap.

== Gallery ==
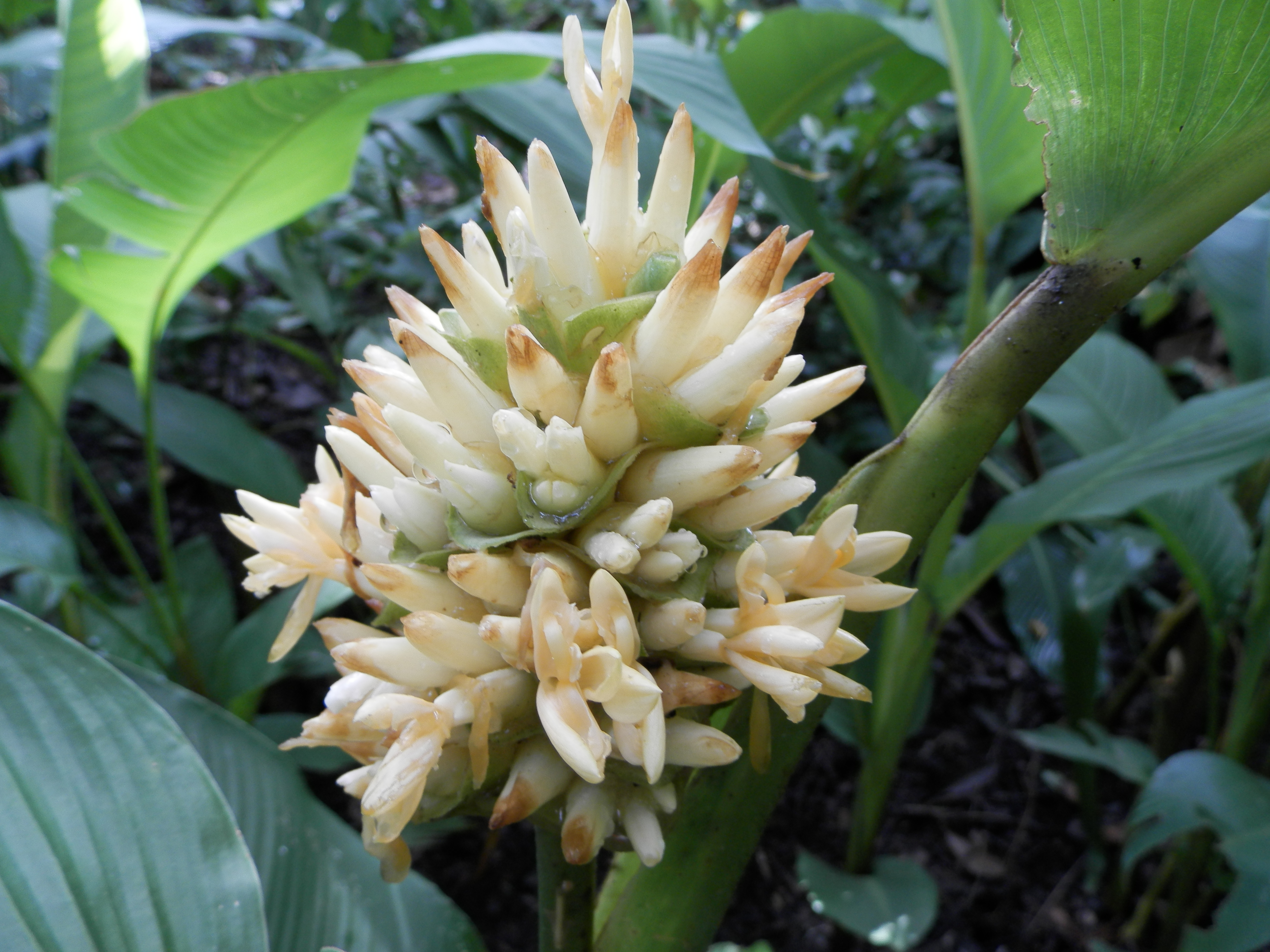
Goeppertia macrosepala flower

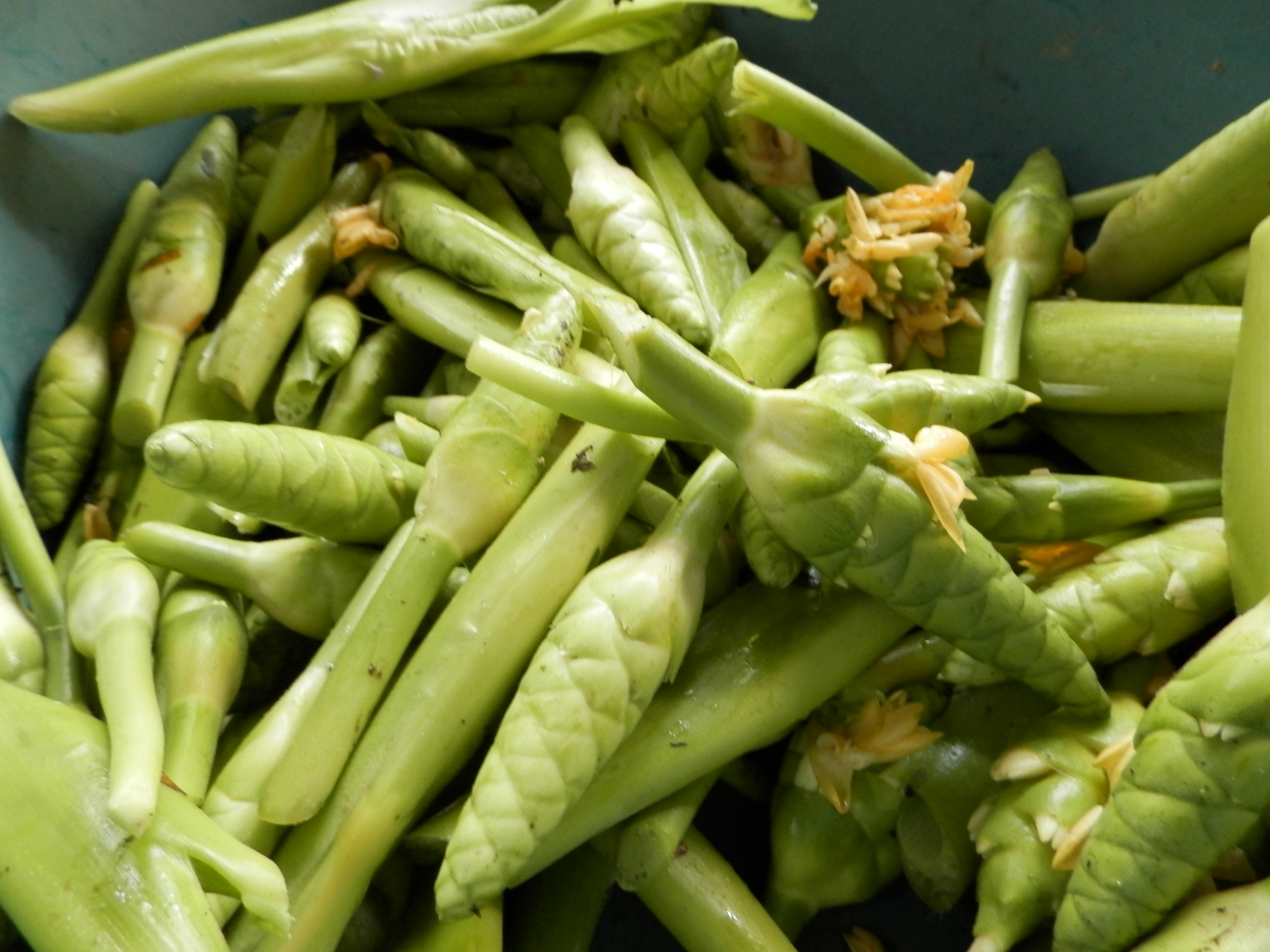
Goeppertia macrosepala immature inflorescences
