= Goeppertia grandis =

Scientific classification
- Kingdom: Plantae
- Clade: Tracheophytes
- Clade: Angiosperms
- Clade: Monocots
- Clade: Commelinids
- Order: Zingiberales
- Family: Marantaceae
- Genus: Goeppertia
- Species: G. grandis

Binomial name
- Goeppertia grandis (Petersen) Borchs. & S.Suárez

Synonyms
- Calathea grandis Petersen; Phyllodes grandis (Petersen) Kuntze

Species of plant

Goeppertia grandis is a species of plant from the genus Goeppertia in the family Marantaceae. It is native to Brazil North, Brazil Northeast, French Guiana, Guyana, Suriname, Trinidad-Tobago and Venezuela. This species belongs to the sub-group of Goeppertia called the Ornata clade.

== Description ==
Goeppertia grandis is a big sized plant of 2 meters or more. It as wide, long and pointy, glossy, blue green leaves with very tall and thick green petioles and a long green pulvinus. It is possible for this species to develop pink stripes on the surface of juvenile leaves, but this type of occurrence is very rare in the wild. It is part of the Ornata group, a sub-group of the genus. The inflorescence of G. grandis is made of multiple bracts around a thick, purple (sometimes green) peduncle. The bracts are thin, green and brown, already almost dried out when they emerge and later decay into brown fiber, which makes it similar to other species which bracts decay into brown fiber like Goeppertia inocephala, Goeppertia altissima or Goeppertia dilabens. The flowers are among the biggest in the genus, are usually white cream with a more yellow creamy center.
