= Goeppertia chimboracensis =

Conservation status
- Endangered (IUCN 3.1)

Scientific classification
- Kingdom: Plantae
- Clade: Embryophytes
- Clade: Tracheophytes
- Clade: Spermatophytes
- Clade: Angiosperms
- Clade: Monocots
- Clade: Commelinids
- Order: Zingiberales
- Family: Marantaceae
- Genus: Goeppertia
- Species: G. chimboracensis

Binomial name
- Goeppertia chimboracensis (Linden) Borchs. & S.Suárez

Synonyms
- Calathea chimboracensis Linden ex André; Calathea lehmannii K.Schum.; Maranta chimboracensis Linden; Phyllodes chimboracensis (Linden) Kuntze

Species of flowering plant

Goeppertia chimboracensis is an endangered species of flowering plant in the Marantaceae family. It is a perennial endemic to Ecuador.

It was first described by Jean Jules Linden. The name chimboracensis refers to the Chimborazo mountains in central Ecuador.

The Tsáchila people of Ecuador use the plant to treat hemorrhage.
