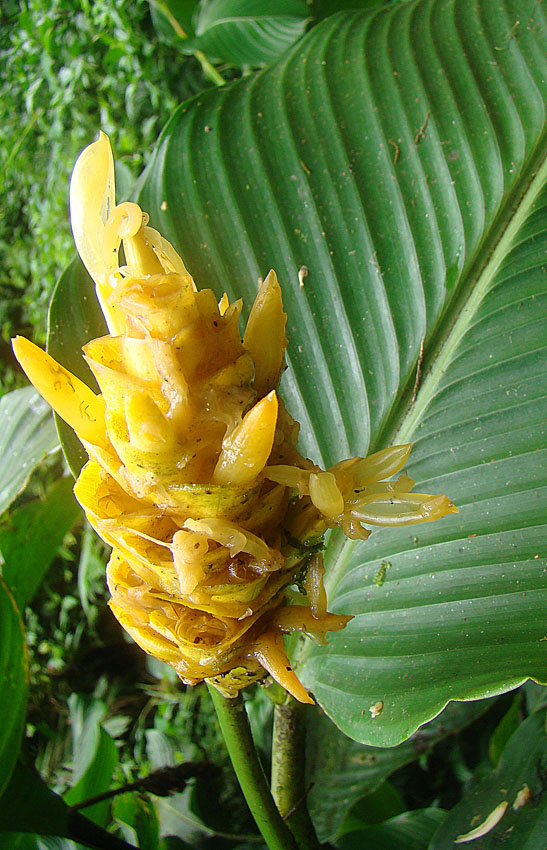

Scientific classification
- Kingdom: Plantae
- Clade: Embryophytes
- Clade: Tracheophytes
- Clade: Angiosperms
- Clade: Monocots
- Clade: Commelinids
- Order: Zingiberales
- Family: Marantaceae
- Genus: Goeppertia
- Species: G. marantifolia

Binomial name
- Goeppertia marantifolia (Standl.) Borchs. & S.Suárez

Synonyms
- Calathea marantifolia Standl.

= Goeppertia marantifolia =

Species of flowering plant

Goeppertia marantifolia is a species of plant in the family Marantaceae. Goeppertia marantifolia is native to Central America to Ecuador. The flowers do not open spontaneously.
