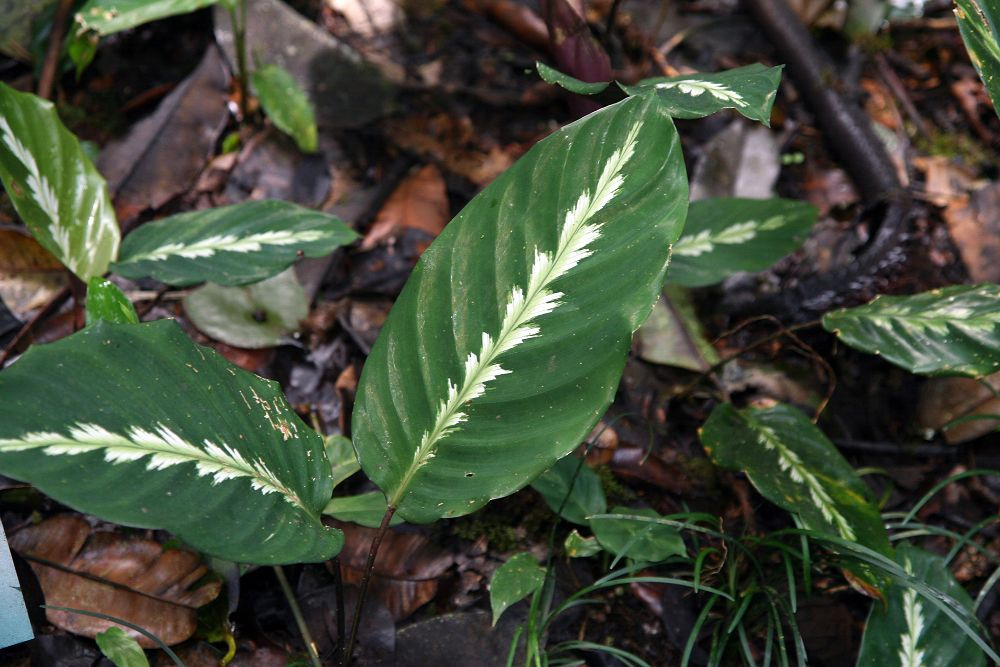

Scientific classification
- Kingdom: Plantae
- Clade: Embryophytes
- Clade: Tracheophytes
- Clade: Spermatophytes
- Clade: Angiosperms
- Clade: Monocots
- Clade: Commelinids
- Order: Zingiberales
- Family: Marantaceae
- Genus: Goeppertia
- Species: G. louisae

Binomial name
- Goeppertia louisae (Gagnep.) Borchs. & S.Suárez

Synonyms
- Calathea louisae (Gagnep.)

= Goeppertia louisae =

Species of flowering plant

Goeppertia louisae (syn. Calathea louisae) is a species of plant belonging to the genus Goeppertia, native to Rio de Janeiro state of southeast Brazil but cultivated in other places as an ornamental.

== Description ==
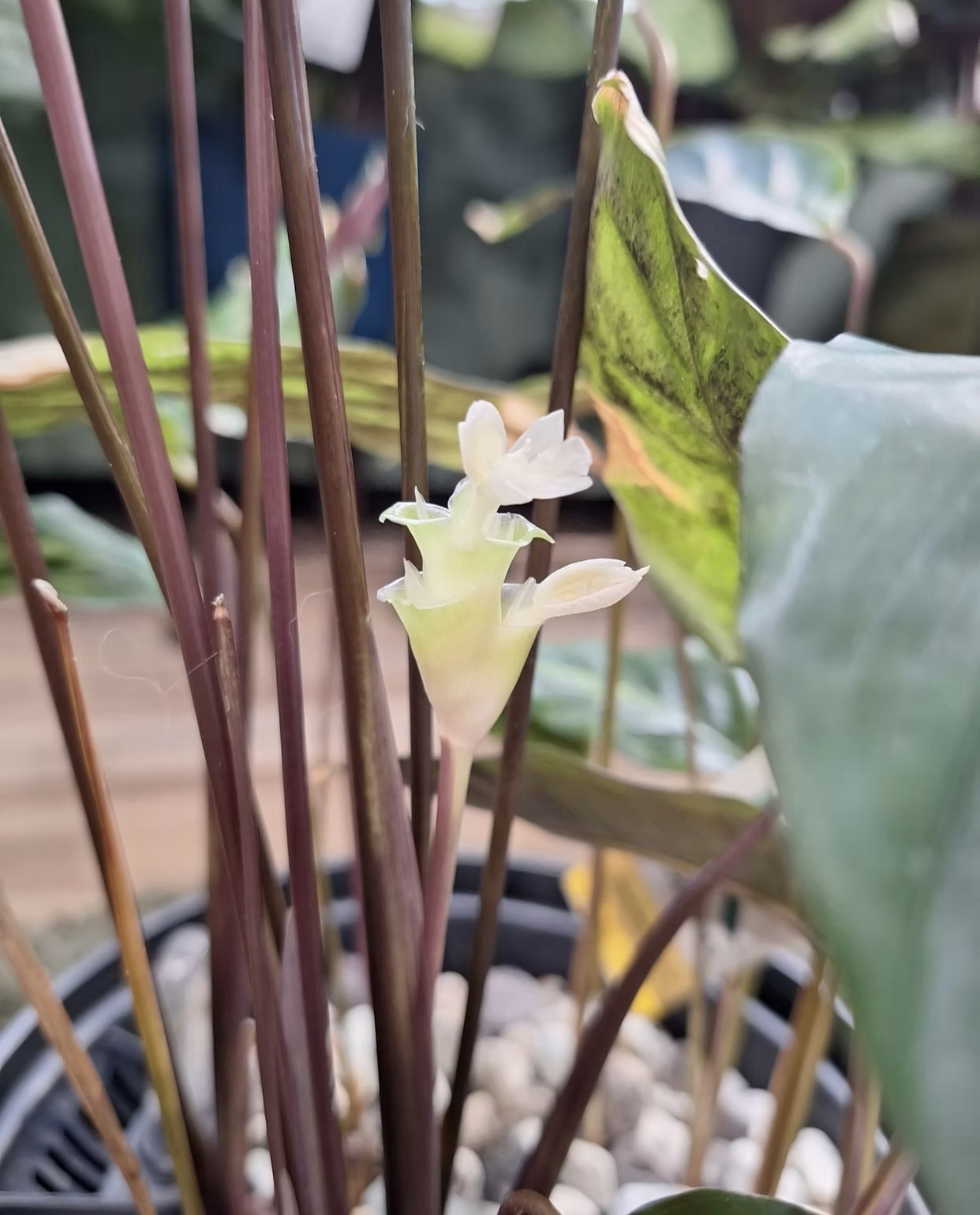
Inflorescence of Goeppertia louisae

Goeppertia louisae is a medium sized plant with pointy, ovale dark green leaves. It has long and thin petioles and a pretty short pulvinus. It has a pattern on above the leaves with a silvery light green bands a few milimeters on each sides of the middle vein. The underside of the leaf is usually purple. The inflorescence of G.louisae is made of multiple bracts on a small and short green peduncle. The bracts are light green and the flowers fully white.

== Discussion ==
It is often sold as Goeppertia louisae "Maui Queen", Maui Queen being supposedly a cultivar. But this was mostly because Goeppertia louisae was confused a lot with Goeppertia albertii in the past and people treated the original G.louisae as a cultivar of the fake G.louisae (being G.albertii). The original description of Goeppertia louisae made by Gagnep corresponds to the plant we call Maui Queen, meaning this is actually the wild form of the species and not a cultivar. Therefore the term "Maui Queen" should probably not be used anymore when talking about the species.
