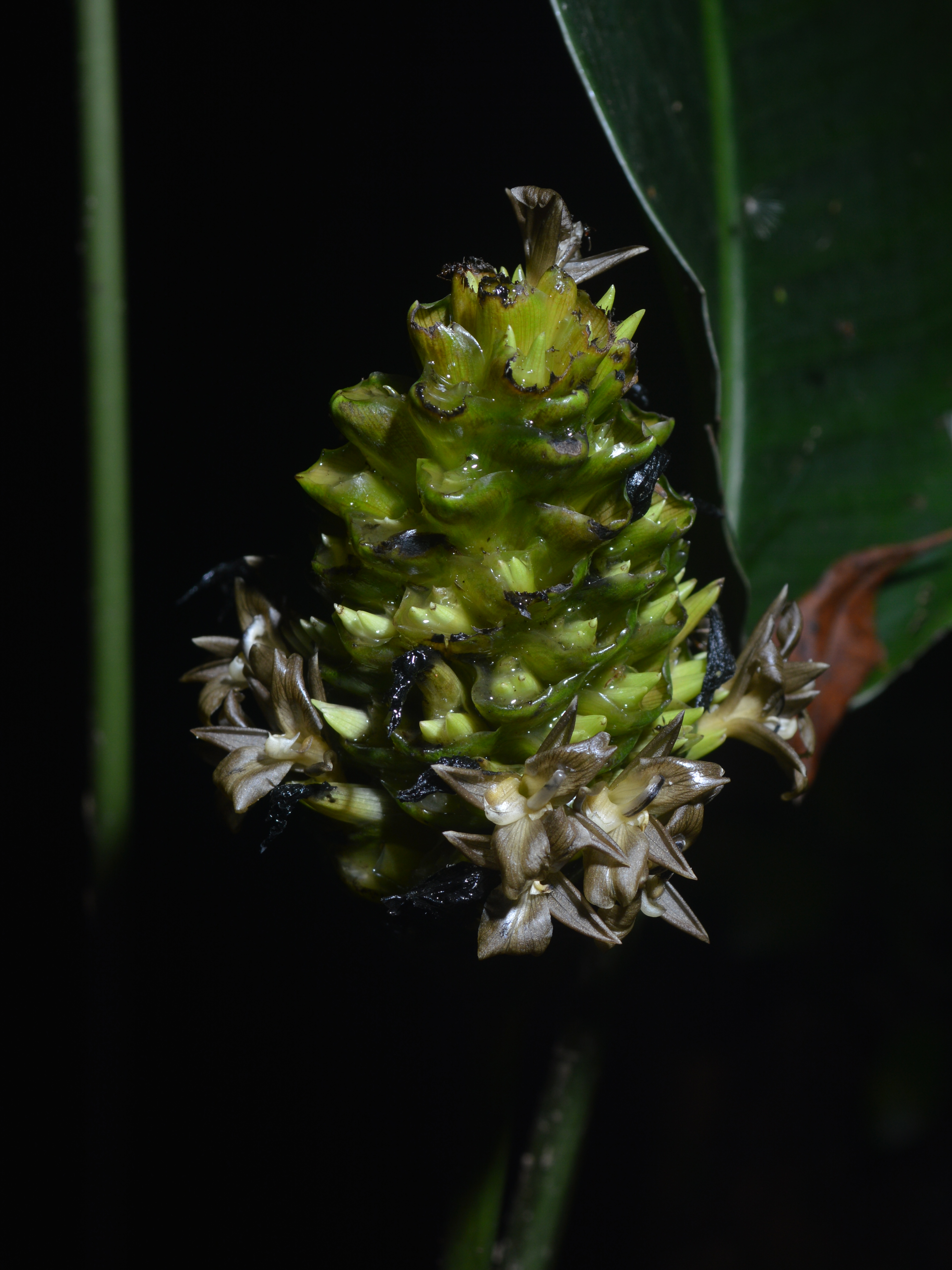

Scientific classification
- Kingdom: Plantae
- Clade: Tracheophytes
- Clade: Angiosperms
- Clade: Monocots
- Clade: Commelinids
- Order: Zingiberales
- Family: Marantaceae
- Genus: Goeppertia
- Species: G. monophylla

Binomial name
- Goeppertia monophylla (Vell.) Borchs. & S.Suárez

Synonyms
- Calathea monophylla (Vell.) Körn.; Maranta monophylla Vell.; Phrynium monophyllum (Vell.) K.Koch; Phyllodes monophylla (Vell.) Kuntze

= Goeppertia monophylla =

Species of flowering plant

Goeppertia monophylla is a species of plant in the Marantaceae family which is native to Brazil.

Goeppertia monophylla blooms annually. Depending on its location, G. monophylla may flower for around four months, or for nearly the entire year. The pollinators of Goeppertia monophylla include the hummingbird Phaethornis ruber and the bee Eulaema (pseudoeulaema) pseudocingulata.
