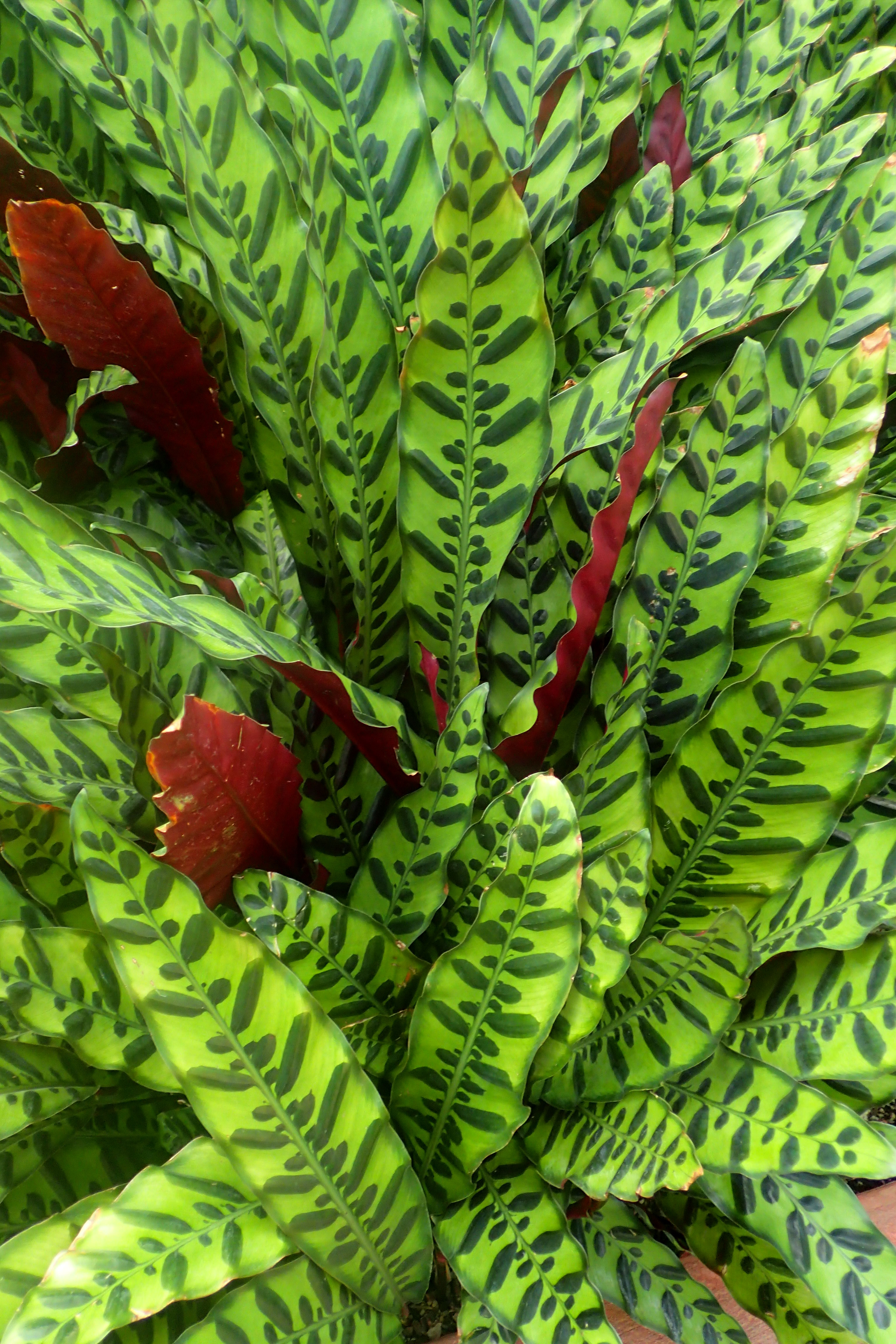
- Goeppertia insignis

Scientific classification
- Kingdom: Plantae
- Clade: Tracheophytes
- Clade: Angiosperms
- Clade: Monocots
- Clade: Commelinids
- Order: Zingiberales
- Family: Marantaceae
- Genus: Goeppertia; Nees, 1831

Synonyms
- Endocodon Raf.; Monostiche Körn.; Psydaranta Neck. ex Raf.; Thymocarpus Nicolson, Steyerm. & Sivad.; Zelmira Raf.

= Goeppertia =

Genus of flowering plants

Goeppertia is a genus of flowering plants in the family Marantaceae, native to the New World Tropics. It contains 246 accepted species, many of which were until recently assigned to Calathea.

== Earlier taxonomic work ==
It was first described by Nees von Esenbeck in 1831, who erroneously erected another genus Goeppertia in 1836, which has now been synonymized with Endlicheria. In 1862 August Grisebach described another genus Goeppertia; this has now been synonymized with Bisgoeppertia. The genus name of Goeppertia is in honour of Heinrich Göppert (1800–1884), a German botanist and paleontologist.

The type species of Goeppertia was Goeppertia zebrina, in 1831, which had been described originally as Maranta zebrina, in 1817 by Sims and transferred to Goeppertia by Nees.

The original genus counted species such as Maranta bicolor, which Nees transferred to Goeppertia as G.bicolor (now synonym of Maranta cristata); Maranta spicata, which he transferred to Goeppertia as G.spicata (now Monotagma spicatum); or Goepperita blanda (now unplaced, not an accepted taxon).

Most of the species composing the old Goeppertia genus were then moved to different genera and the name Goeppertia was not retained in later work.

== Later taxonomic treatment ==
The genus was resurrected in 2012 after a molecular study by Finn Borchsenius, Luz Stella Suarez and Linda Marie (Prince) MacKechnie on the genus Calathea , which had been discovered to be polyphyletic. Earlier studies like the molecular sampling by L.Andersson in 2001 already had shown that the genus was thought to be paraphyletic, but lacked taxon sampling to support an actual redefinition.

The 2012 studies showed that the broad Calathea genus had two, major, evolutionary lineage and needed to be reconsidered. The first included subgenus Calathea, the C.Lanicaulis group and the Sanblasia genus, while the second formed a strongly supported group.

As the type species for the Calathea genus was Calathea casupo (now synonym for Calathea lutea), the first evolutionnary lineage which included Calathea lutea was considered as the newly defined, Calathea taxon. The genus Goeppertia was brought back to include the rest of the taxa from the other lineage. As the type species was Maranta zebrina (Goeppertia zebrina by Nees in 1831), Calathea zebrina and related groups were moved into a newly defined Goeppertia taxon.

- - Goeppertia
  - - Monotagma
    - - Calathea
      - - Pleiostachya
        - Ischnosiphon

== Morphologic characters ==
In the 2012 work, Finn Borchsenius proposed a new definition for both taxa, including a new Goeppertia one.

He describes Goeppertia as plants with basal and/or cauline leaves. With green or patterned leaves, which sometimes only show on juvenile specimen. With spirally arranged bracts and flowers with one outer staminode and an ovary with three fertile locules. The fruit has 3 seeds with a white aril. Their range is from Mexico and Caribbean islands to Argentina and Paraguay.

== Major clades ==
Borchsenius, Suarez and Prince (2012) identified six major clades within the Goeppertia genus using molecular phylogenetic sampling. These clades were supporting or demistifying informal groups that were recognized in earlier taxonomic treatments by experts such as Helen Kennedy or Schumann. The Comosae clade, which includes both of the old informal C.capitata group and the Comosae group. The Breviscapus clade, which included informal groups such as Nudiscapae, Breviscapus or subgenus Macropus. The Microcephalum clade, which included the old informal Microcephalum group. The Scapifoliae clade, which included the informal C.marantifolia group. The Ornata clade, which included the old C.ornata group. And lastly the Straminea clade, a new clade suggested for some species such as Calathea straminea, Calathea zingiberina or Calathea cannoides.

Only the species that have been sampled to this day can be applied to one of the clades.

Taxa that were sampled and the clade they belong to from the 2012 molecular sampling.

Taxon sampled	Current name	Clade
Calathea ecuadoriana	Goeppertia ecuadoriana	Comosae
Calathea attenuata	Goeppertia attenuata	Comosae
Calathea silvosa	Goeppertia silvosa	Comosae
Calathea capitata	Goeppertia capitata	Comosae
Calathea lanata	Goeppertia lanata	Comosae
Calathea loeseneri	Goeppertia loeseneri	Comosae
Calathea leonia	Goeppertia leonae	Comosae
Calathea petersenii	Goeppertia petersenii	Comosae
Calathea cyclophora	Goeppertia cyclophora	Comosae
Calathea mishuyacu	Goeppertia mishuyacu	Breviscapus
Calathea standleyi	Goeppertia standleyi	Breviscapus
Calathea propinqua	Goeppertia propinqua	Breviscapus
Calathea bella	Goeppertia kegeljanii	Breviscapus
Calathea rufibarba	Goeppertia rufibarba	Breviscapus
Calathea varians	Goeppertia varians	Breviscapus
Calathea pavonii	Goeppertia pavonii	Breviscapus
Calathea villosa	Goeppertia villosa	Breviscapus
Calathea fucata	Goeppertia fucata	Microcephalum
Calathea micans	Goeppertia micans	Microcephalum
Calathea curaraya	Goeppertia curaraya	Microcephalum
Calathea microcephala	Goeppertia microcephala	Microcephalum
Calathea undulata	Goeppertia undulata	Microcephalum
Calathea killipii	Goeppertia killipii	Microcephalum
Calathea foliosa	Goeppertia foliosa	Scapifoliae
Calathea warscewiczii	Goeppertia warszewiczii	Scapifoliae
Calathea latifolia	Goeppertia latifolia	Scapifoliae
Calathea vinosa	Goeppertia vinosa	Scapifoliae
Calathea altissima	Goeppertia altissima	Ornata
Calathea variegata	Goeppertia variegata	Ornata
Calathea inocephala	Goeppertia inocephala	Ornata
Calathea gymnocarpa	Goeppertia gymnocarpa	Ornata
Calathea straminea	Goeppertia straminea	Straminea

== Species ==
The following species are accepted:

- Goeppertia ackermannii (Körn.) Borchs. & S.Suárez
- Goeppertia acuminata (Steyerm.) Borchs. & S.Suárez
- Goeppertia aemula (Körn.) Borchs. & S.Suárez
- Goeppertia affinis (Fenzl ex Regel) Borchs. & S.Suárez
- Goeppertia albertii (L.H.Bailey & Raffill) Borchs. & S.Suárez
- Goeppertia albovaginata (K.Koch & Linden) Borchs. & S.Suárez
- Goeppertia allenii (Woodson) Borchs. & S.Suárez
- Goeppertia allouia (Aubl.) Borchs. & S.Suárez
- Goeppertia altissima (Poepp. & Endl.) Borchs. & S.Suárez
- Goeppertia amazonica (H.Kenn.) Borchs. & S.Suárez
- Goeppertia angustifolia (Körn.) Borchs. & S.Suárez
- Goeppertia annae (H.Kenn. & J.M.A.Braga) Borchs. & S.Suárez
- Goeppertia applicata (Jacob-Makoy ex É.Morren) Borchs. & S.Suárez
- Goeppertia argyraea (Linden ex J.Dix) Borchs. & S.Suárez
- Goeppertia argyrophylla (Linden ex K.Koch) Borchs. & S.Suárez
- Goeppertia arrabidae (Körn.) Borchs. & S.Suárez
- Goeppertia atropurpurea (Matuda) Borchs. & S.Suárez
- Goeppertia attenuata (H.Kenn.) Borchs. & S.Suárez
- Goeppertia bachemiana (É.Morren) Borchs. & S.Suárez
- Goeppertia bantae (H.Kenn.) Borchs. & S.Suárez
- Goeppertia baraquinii (Lem.) Borchs. & S.Suárez
- Goeppertia barbata (Petersen) Borchs. & S.Suárez
- Goeppertia basiflora (H.Kenn.) J.M.A.Braga
- Goeppertia bellula (Linden) Borchs. & S.Suárez
- Goeppertia brasiliensis (Körn.) Borchs. & S.Suárez
- Goeppertia brevipes (Körn.) Borchs. & S.Suárez
- Goeppertia brunnescens (K.Koch) Borchs. & S.Suárez
- Goeppertia buchtienii (Pax) Borchs. & S.Suárez
- Goeppertia burle-marxii (H.Kenn.) Borchs. & S.Suárez
- Goeppertia cannoides (Nicolson, Steyerm. & Sivad.) Borchs. & S.Suárez
- Goeppertia capitata (Ruiz & Pav.) Borchs. & S.Suárez
- Goeppertia caquetensis (S.Suárez & Galeano) Borchs. & S.Suárez
- Goeppertia carolineae (H.Kenn.) J.M.A.Braga
- Goeppertia cataractarum (K.Schum.) Borchs. & S.Suárez
- Goeppertia chimboracensis (Linden) Borchs. & S.Suárez
- Goeppertia chrysoleuca (Poepp. & Endl.) Borchs. & S.Suárez
- Goeppertia cinerea (Regel) Borchs. & S.Suárez
- Goeppertia cleistantha (Standl.) Borchs. & S.Suárez
- Goeppertia clivorum (H.Kenn.) Borchs. & S.Suárez
- Goeppertia coccinea (Standl. & Steyerm.) Borchs. & S.Suárez
- Goeppertia colombiana (L.B.Sm. & Idrobo) Borchs. & S.Suárez
- Goeppertia colorata (Hook.) Borchs. & S.Suárez
- Goeppertia communis (Wand. & S.Vieira) Borchs. & S.Suárez
- Goeppertia comosa (L.f.) Borchs. & S.Suárez
- Goeppertia compacta (S.Suárez & Galeano) Borchs. & S.Suárez
- Goeppertia concinna (W.Bull) Borchs. & S.Suárez
- Goeppertia concolor (Eichler ex Petersen) Borchs. & S.Suárez
- Goeppertia contrafenestra (H.Kenn.) Borchs. & S.Suárez
- Goeppertia coriacea (H.Kenn.) Borchs. & S.Suárez
- Goeppertia crocata (É.Morren & Joriss.) Borchs. & S.Suárez
- Goeppertia cuneata (H.Kenn.) Borchs. & S.Suárez
- Goeppertia curaraya (H.Kenn.) Borchs. & S.Suárez
- Goeppertia cyclophora (Baker) Borchs. & S.Suárez
- Goeppertia cylindrica (Roscoe) Borchs. & S.Suárez
- Goeppertia densa (K.Koch & Linden) Borchs. & S.Suárez
- Goeppertia dicephala (Poepp. & Endl.) Borchs. & S.Suárez
- Goeppertia dilabens (L.Andersson & H.Kenn.) Borchs. & S.Suárez
- Goeppertia dodsonii (H.Kenn.) Borchs. & S.Suárez
- Goeppertia donnell-smithii (K.Schum.) Borchs. & S.Suárez
- Goeppertia dorothyae (J.M.A.Braga & H.Kenn.) J.M.A.Braga
- Goeppertia dressleri (H.Kenn.) Borchs. & S.Suárez
- Goeppertia dryadica (J.M.A.Braga) Borchs. & S.Suárez
- Goeppertia eburnea (André & Linden) Borchs. & S.Suárez
- Goeppertia ecuadoriana (H.Kenn.) Borchs. & S.Suárez
- Goeppertia effusa Saka & Lombardi
- Goeppertia eichleri (Petersen) Borchs. & S.Suárez
- Goeppertia elegans (H.Kenn.) Borchs. & S.Suárez
- Goeppertia elliptica (Roscoe) Borchs. & S.Suárez
- Goeppertia enclitica (J.F.Macbr.) Borchs. & S.Suárez
- Goeppertia erecta (L.Andersson & H.Kenn.) Borchs. & S.Suárez
- Goeppertia eximia (K.Koch & C.D.Bouché) Borchs. & S.Suárez
- Goeppertia exscapa (Poepp. & Endl.) Borchs. & S.Suárez
- Goeppertia fasciata (Linden ex K.Koch) Borchs. & S.Suárez
- Goeppertia fatimae (H.Kenn. & J.M.A.Braga) Borchs. & S.Suárez
- Goeppertia flavescens (Lindl.) Borchs. & S.Suárez
- Goeppertia foliosa (Rowlee ex Woodson & Schery) Borchs. & S.Suárez
- Goeppertia fragilis (Gleason) Borchs. & S.Suárez
- Goeppertia fucata (H.Kenn.) Borchs. & S.Suárez
- Goeppertia gandersii (H.Kenn.) Borchs. & S.Suárez
- Goeppertia gardneri (Baker) Borchs. & S.Suárez
- Goeppertia gloriana (H.Kenn.) Borchs. & S.Suárez
- Goeppertia gordonii (H.Kenn.) F.Silva & J.M.A.Braga
- Goeppertia grandis (Petersen) Borchs. & S.Suárez
- Goeppertia granvillei (L.Andersson & H.Kenn.) Borchs. & S.Suárez
- Goeppertia grazielae (H.Kenn. & J.M.A.Braga) Borchs. & S.Suárez
- Goeppertia guianensis (Klotzsch ex Benth. & Hook.f.) Borchs. & S.Suárez
- Goeppertia gymnocarpa (H.Kenn.) Borchs. & S.Suárez
- Goeppertia hammelii (H.Kenn.) Borchs. & S.Suárez
- Goeppertia hieroglyphica (Linden & André) Borchs. & S.Suárez
- Goeppertia humilis (S.Moore) Borchs. & S.Suárez
- Goeppertia hylaeanthoides (H.Kenn.) Borchs. & S.Suárez
- Goeppertia incompta (H.Kenn.) Borchs. & S.Suárez
- Goeppertia indecora (Woodson) Borchs. & S.Suárez
- Goeppertia inocephala (Kuntze) Borchs. & S.Suárez
- Goeppertia insignis (W.Bull ex W.E.Marshall) J.M.A.Braga, L.J.T.Cardoso & R.Couto
- Goeppertia jagoriana (Regel) Borchs. & S.Suárez
- Goeppertia jocosa (J.F.Macbr.) Borchs. & S.Suárez
- Goeppertia joffilyana (J.M.A.Braga) Borchs. & S.Suárez
- Goeppertia kappleriana (Körn. ex Horan.) Borchs. & S.Suárez
- Goeppertia kegeljanii (É.Morren) Saka
- Goeppertia killipii (L.B.Sm. & Idrobo) Borchs. & S.Suárez
- Goeppertia koernickeana (Regel) J.M.A.Braga
- Goeppertia kummeriana (É.Morren) Borchs. & S.Suárez
- Goeppertia laetevirens (Huber) Borchs. & S.Suárez
- Goeppertia lagoagriana (H.Kenn.) Borchs. & S.Suárez
- Goeppertia lanata (Petersen) Borchs. & S.Suárez
- Goeppertia lasiophylla (H.Kenn.) Borchs. & S.Suárez
- Goeppertia lasseriana (Steyerm.) Borchs. & S.Suárez
- Goeppertia latifolia (Willd. ex Link) Borchs. & S.Suárez
- Goeppertia legrelleana (Linden) Borchs. & S.Suárez
- Goeppertia leonae (Sander) Borchs. & S.Suárez
- Goeppertia leonoriae (Lascur., H.Oliva & Avendaño) Borchs. & S.Suárez
- Goeppertia leucostachys (Hook.f.) Borchs. & S.Suárez
- Goeppertia libbyana (H.Kenn.) Borchs. & S.Suárez
- Goeppertia liesneri (H.Kenn.) Borchs. & S.Suárez
- Goeppertia lietzei (É.Morren) Saka
- Goeppertia lindbergii (Petersen) Borchs. & S.Suárez
- Goeppertia lindeniana (Wallis) Borchs. & S.Suárez
- Goeppertia lindmanii (K.Schum.) Borchs. & S.Suárez
- Goeppertia littoralis (Körn.) Borchs. & S.Suárez
- Goeppertia loeseneri (J.F.Macbr.) Borchs. & S.Suárez
- Goeppertia longibracteata (Lindl.) Borchs. & S.Suárez
- Goeppertia longiflora (H.Kenn.) Borchs. & S.Suárez
- Goeppertia longipetiolata (H.Kenn.) Borchs. & S.Suárez
- Goeppertia louisae (Gagnep.) Borchs. & S.Suárez
- Goeppertia luciani (Linden) Borchs. & S.Suárez
- Goeppertia maasiorum (H.Kenn.) Borchs. & S.Suárez
- Goeppertia macilenta (Lindl.) Borchs. & S.Suárez
- Goeppertia macrosepala (K.Schum.) Borchs. & S.Suárez
- Goeppertia majestica (Linden) Borchs. & S.Suárez
- Goeppertia makoyana (É.Morren) Borchs. & S.Suárez
- Goeppertia mandioccae (Körn.) Borchs. & S.Suárez
- Goeppertia mansoi (Körn.) Borchs. & S.Suárez
- Goeppertia marantifolia (Standl.) Borchs. & S.Suárez
- Goeppertia martinicensis (Urb.) Borchs. & S.Suárez
- Goeppertia matudae (H.Kenn. & Ganders) Borchs. & S.Suárez
- Goeppertia mediopicta (Jacob-Makoy ex É.Morren) Borchs. & S.Suárez
- Goeppertia mendesiana Saka & Popovkin
- Goeppertia metallica (Planch. & Linden) Borchs. & S.Suárez
- Goeppertia micans (L.Mathieu) Borchs. & S.Suárez
- Goeppertia microcephala (Poepp. & Endl.) Borchs. & S.Suárez
- Goeppertia mirabilis (Jacob-Makoy ex É.Morren) Borchs. & S.Suárez
- Goeppertia misantlensis (Lascur.) Borchs. & S.Suárez
- Goeppertia mishuyacu (J.F.Macbr.) Borchs. & S.Suárez
- Goeppertia modesta (Brongn. ex Gris) Borchs. & S.Suárez
- Goeppertia monophylla (Vell.) Borchs. & S.Suárez
- Goeppertia multicincta (H.Kenn.) Borchs. & S.Suárez
- Goeppertia neblinensis (H.Kenn.) Borchs. & S.Suárez
- Goeppertia neoviedii (Petersen) Borchs. & S.Suárez
- Goeppertia nidulans (L.B.Sm. & Idrobo) Borchs. & S.Suárez
- Goeppertia nigricans (Gagnep.) Borchs. & S.Suárez
- Goeppertia nigrocostata (Linden & André) Borchs. & S.Suárez
- Goeppertia nitidifolia (H.Kenn.) Borchs. & S.Suárez
- Goeppertia nobilis (K.Koch) Borchs. & S.Suárez
- Goeppertia oblonga (Mart.) Borchs. & S.Suárez
- Goeppertia orbifolia (Linden) Borchs. & S.Suárez
- Goeppertia ornata (Linden) Borchs. & S.Suárez
- Goeppertia ovandensis (Matuda) Borchs. & S.Suárez
- Goeppertia ovata (Nees & Mart.) Borchs. & S.Suárez
- Goeppertia pachystachya (Poepp. & Endl.) Borchs. & S.Suárez
- Goeppertia pacifica (Linden & André) Borchs. & S.Suárez
- Goeppertia pallidicosta (H.Kenn.) Borchs. & S.Suárez
- Goeppertia panamensis (Rowlee) Borchs. & S.Suárez
- Goeppertia paucifolia (H.Kenn.) Borchs. & S.Suárez
- Goeppertia pavonii (Körn.) Borchs. & S.Suárez
- Goeppertia pavonina (K.Koch & Linden) Borchs. & S.Suárez
- Goeppertia pearcei (Rusby) Borchs. & S.Suárez
- Goeppertia peregrina (H.Kenn.) J.M.A.Braga
- Goeppertia peruviana (Körn.) Borchs. & S.Suárez
- Goeppertia petersenii (Eggers) Borchs. & S.Suárez
- Goeppertia picturata (K.Koch & Linden) Borchs. & S.Suárez
- Goeppertia pittieri (K.Schum.) Borchs. & S.Suárez
- Goeppertia plicata (H.Kenn.) Borchs. & S.Suárez
- Goeppertia poeppigiana (Loes. ex H.Kenn.) Borchs. & S.Suárez
- Goeppertia porphyrocaulis (W.Bull) Borchs. & S.Suárez
- Goeppertia portobelensis (H.Kenn.) Borchs. & S.Suárez
- Goeppertia praecox (S.Moore) Borchs. & S.Suárez
- Goeppertia prolifera (Vell.) Borchs. & S.Suárez
- Goeppertia propinqua (Poepp. & Endl.) Borchs. & S.Suárez
- Goeppertia pruinata (W.Bull) Borchs. & S.Suárez
- Goeppertia pseudoveitchiana (H.Kenn.) Borchs. & S.Suárez
- Goeppertia pulchella Borchs. & S.Suárez
- Goeppertia pumila (Vell.) Borchs. & S.Suárez
- Goeppertia regalis (Rollison ex Lem.) Borchs. & S.Suárez
- Goeppertia reginae (J.M.A.Braga) Borchs. & S.Suárez
- Goeppertia rhizanthoides (H.Kenn.) J.M.A.Braga
- Goeppertia robin-fosteri (H.Kenn.) Borchs. & S.Suárez
- Goeppertia robiniae (H.Kenn.) Borchs. & S.Suárez
- Goeppertia rodeckiana (K.Schum.) Borchs. & S.Suárez
- Goeppertia roseobracteata (H.Kenn.) Borchs. & S.Suárez
- Goeppertia roseopicta (Linden ex Lem.) Borchs. & S.Suárez
- Goeppertia rossii (Körn.) Borchs. & S.Suárez
- Goeppertia rufibarba (Fenzl) Borchs. & S.Suárez
- Goeppertia sanderiana (Sander) Borchs. & S.Suárez
- Goeppertia saxicola (Hoehne) Borchs. & S.Suárez
- Goeppertia schunkei (H.Kenn.) Borchs. & S.Suárez
- Goeppertia sciuroides (Petersen) Borchs. & S.Suárez
- Goeppertia selbyana (H.Kenn.) Borchs. & S.Suárez
- Goeppertia sellowii (Körn.) Borchs. & S.Suárez
- Goeppertia silvicola (H.Kenn.) Borchs. & S.Suárez
- Goeppertia silvosa (J.F.Macbr.) Borchs. & S.Suárez
- Goeppertia singularis (H.Kenn.) Borchs. & S.Suárez
- Goeppertia soconuscum (Matuda) Borchs. & S.Suárez
- Goeppertia sophiae (Huber) Borchs. & S.Suárez
- Goeppertia sousandradeana (H.Kenn. & Ganders) Borchs. & S.Suárez
- Goeppertia sphaerocephala (K.Schum.) Borchs. & S.Suárez
- Goeppertia splendida (Lem.) Borchs. & S.Suárez
- Goeppertia squarrosa (L.Andersson & H.Kenn.) Borchs. & S.Suárez
- Goeppertia standleyi (J.F.Macbr.) Borchs. & S.Suárez
- Goeppertia steyermarkii (H.Kenn. & Nagata) Borchs. & S.Suárez
- Goeppertia straminea (Petersen) Borchs. & S.Suárez
- Goeppertia stromanthifolia (Rusby) Borchs. & S.Suárez
- Goeppertia subtilis (S.Moore) Borchs. & S.Suárez
- Goeppertia tinalandia (H.Kenn.) Borchs. & S.Suárez
- Goeppertia trichoneura (H.Kenn.) Borchs. & S.Suárez
- Goeppertia truncata (Link ex A.Dietr.) Borchs. & S.Suárez
- Goeppertia tuberosa (Vell.) Borchs. & S.Suárez
- Goeppertia ucayalina (Huber) Borchs. & S.Suárez
- Goeppertia ulotricha (J.F.Macbr.) Borchs. & S.Suárez
- Goeppertia umbrosa (Körn.) Borchs. & S.Suárez
- Goeppertia undulata (Linden & André) Borchs. & S.Suárez
- Goeppertia ursina (Standl.) Borchs. & S.Suárez
- Goeppertia vaginata (Petersen) Borchs. & S.Suárez
- Goeppertia varians (K.Koch & L.Mathieu) Borchs. & S.Suárez
- Goeppertia variegata (K.Koch) Borchs. & S.Suárez
- Goeppertia veitchiana (Veitch ex Hook.f.) Borchs. & S.Suárez
- Goeppertia velutina (Poepp. & Endl.) Borchs. & S.Suárez
- Goeppertia venusta (H.Kenn.) Borchs. & S.Suárez
- Goeppertia verapax (Donn.Sm.) Borchs. & S.Suárez
- Goeppertia verecunda (H.Kenn.) Borchs. & S.Suárez
- Goeppertia villosa (Lindl.) Borchs. & S.Suárez
- Goeppertia vinosa (H.Kenn.) Borchs. & S.Suárez
- Goeppertia violacea (Lindl.) J.M.A.Braga & F.Silva
- Goeppertia virginalis (Linden ex Regel) Borchs. & S.Suárez
- Goeppertia wallisii (Linden) Borchs. & S.Suárez
- Goeppertia warszewiczii (Lem.) Borchs. & S.Suárez
- Goeppertia whitei (Rusby) Borchs. & S.Suárez
- Goeppertia widgrenii (Körn.) Borchs. & S.Suárez
- Goeppertia williamsii (J.F.Macbr.) Borchs. & S.Suárez
- Goeppertia wiotii (É.Morren) Borchs. & S.Suárez
- Goeppertia yoshida-arnsiae N.Luna & Saka
- Goeppertia zebrina (Sims) Nees
- Goeppertia zingiberina (Körn.) Borchs. & S.Suárez

== Media ==
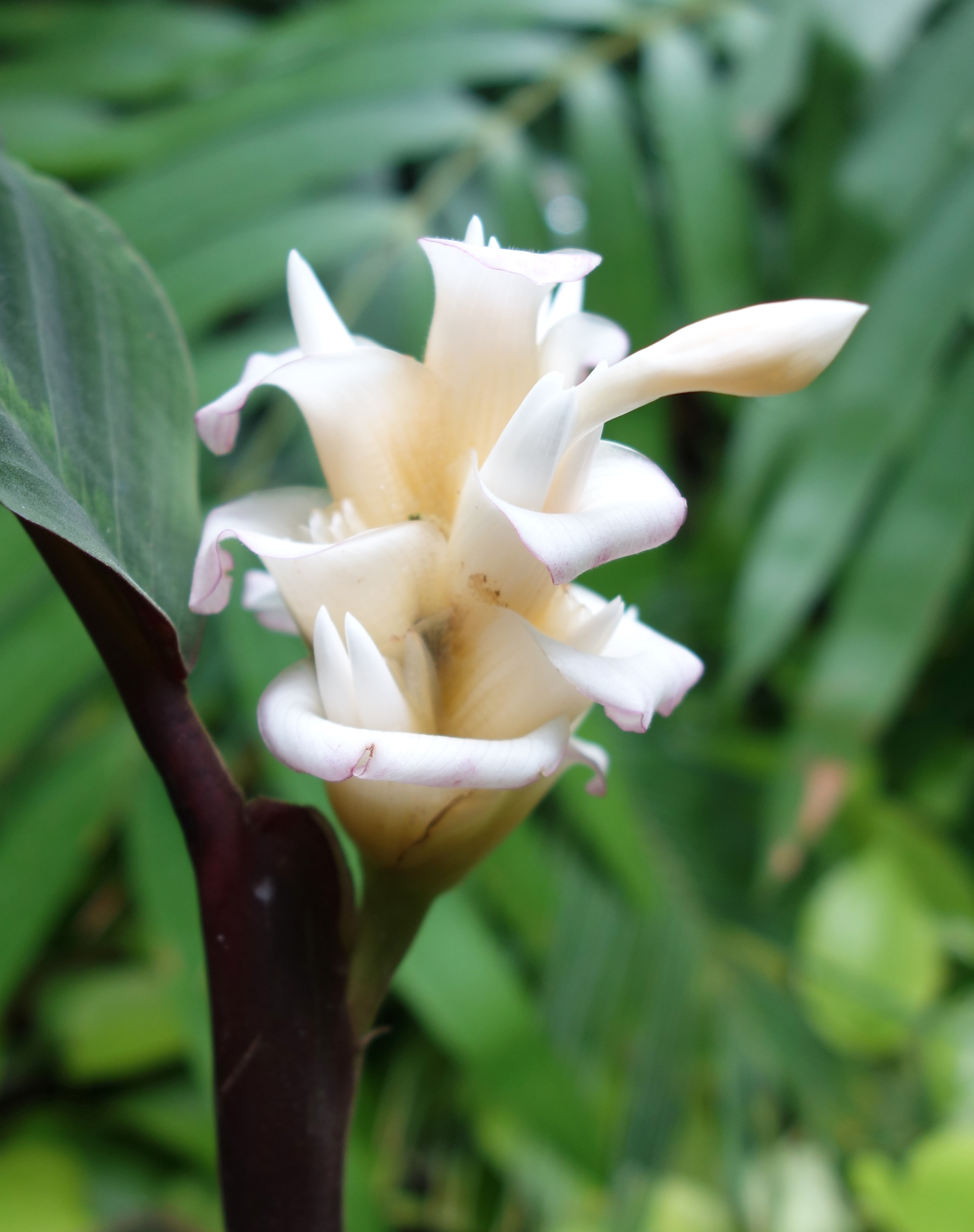
Goeppertia warszewiczii inflorescence

Goeppertia crocata inflorescence

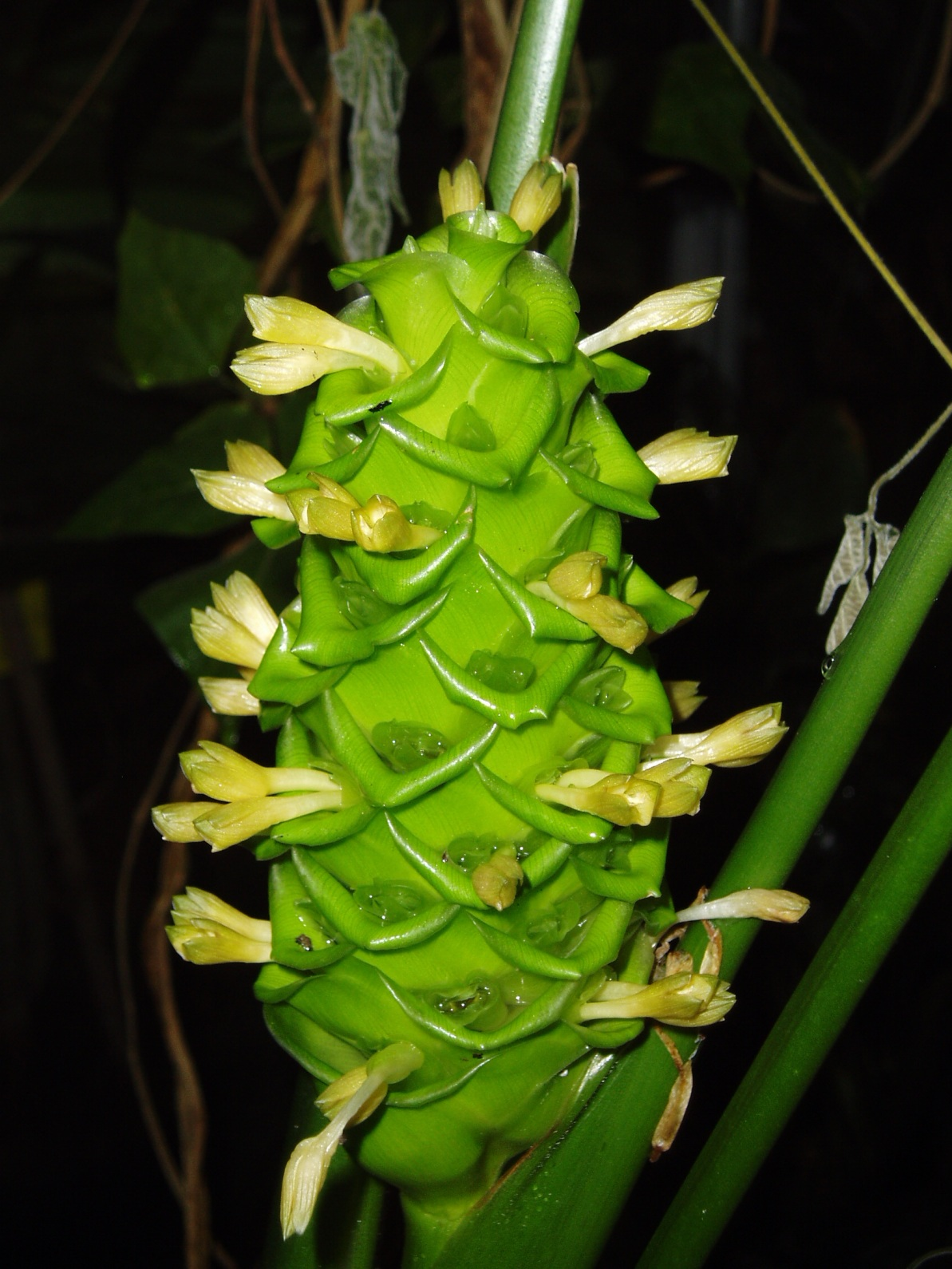
Goeppertia cylindrica inflorescence

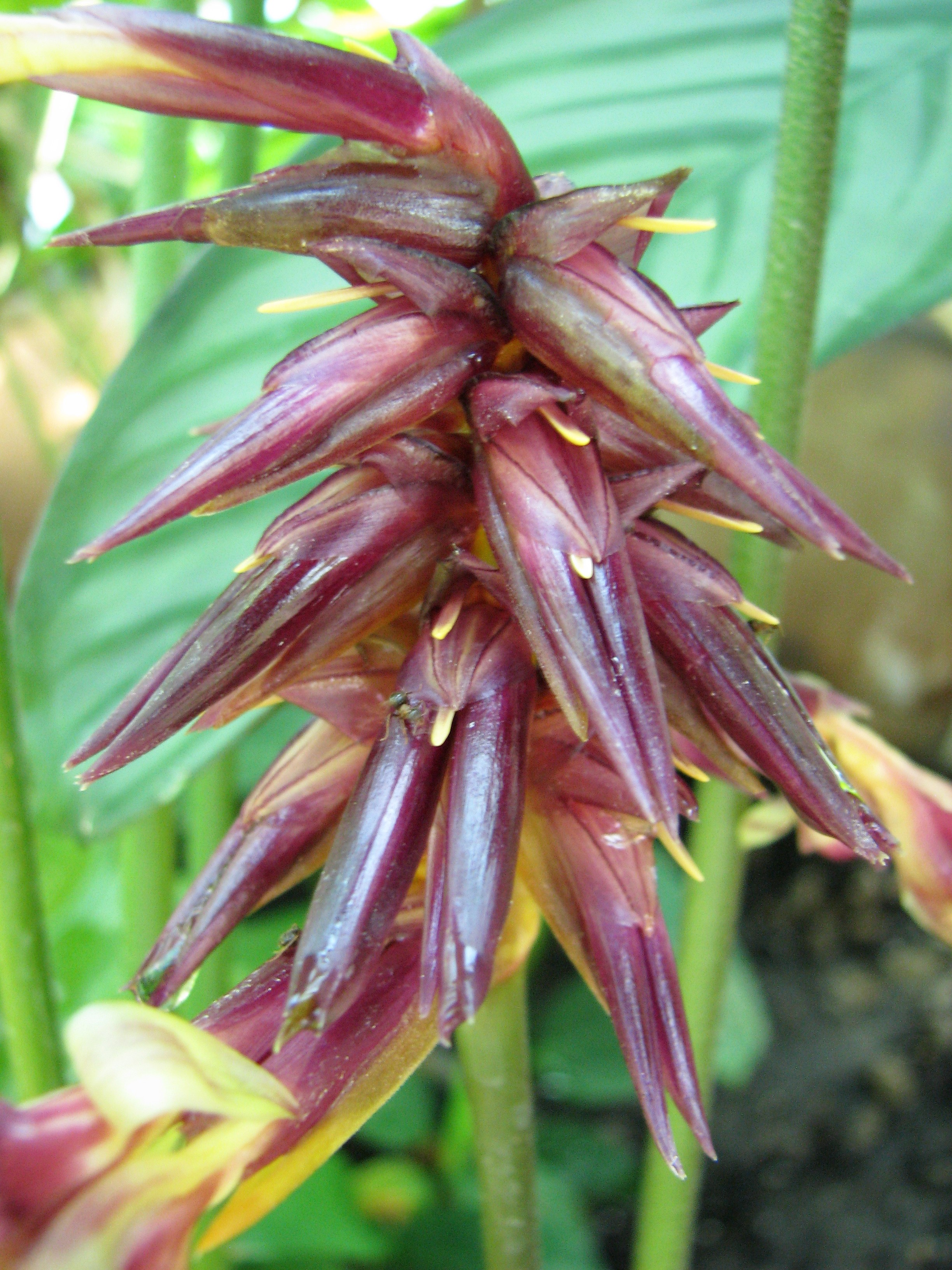
Goeppertia sanderiana inflorescence

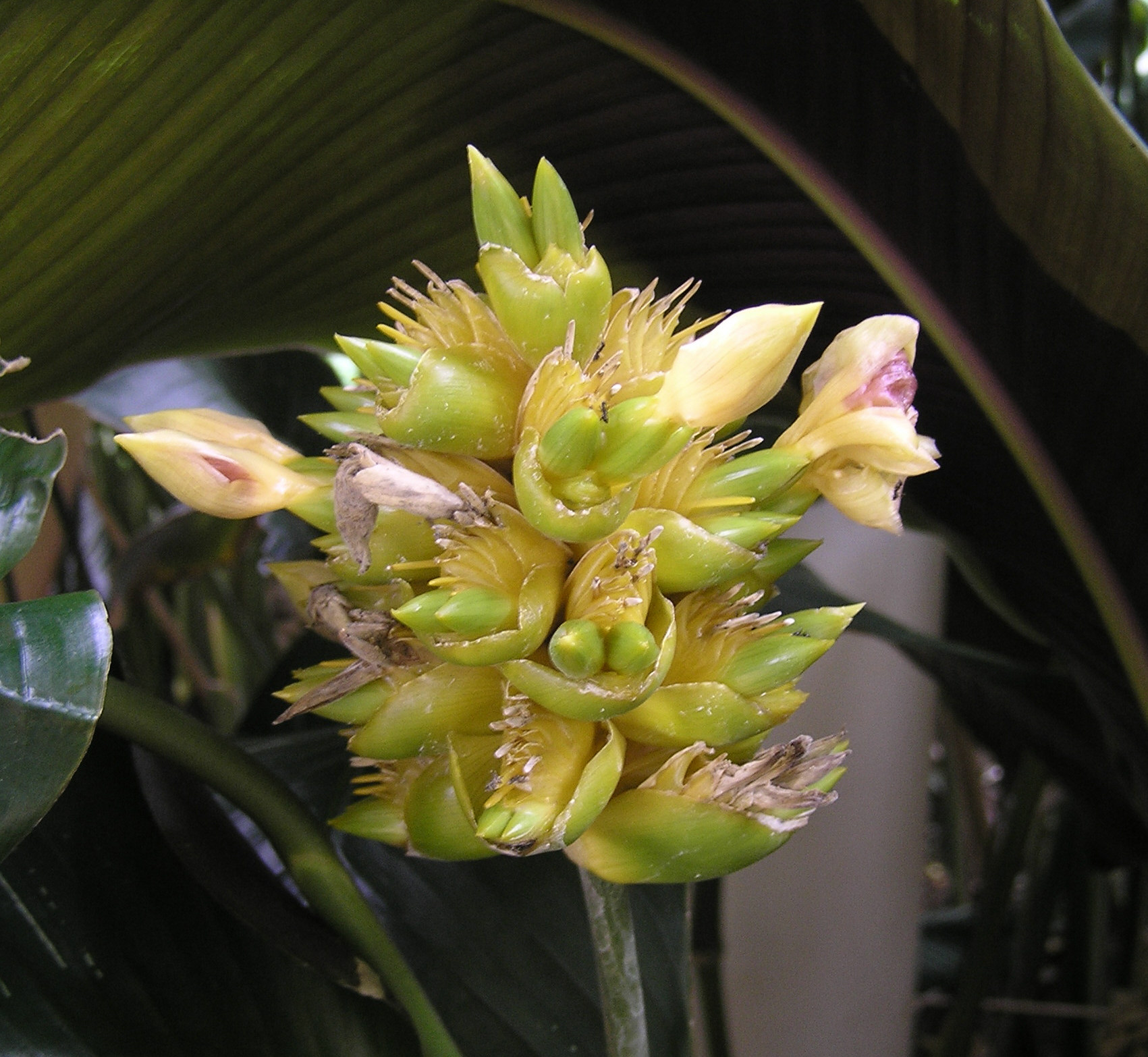
Goeppertia majestica inflorescence

Goeppertia rufibarba inflorescence

Goeppertia insignis leaves

Goeppertia albertii leaves

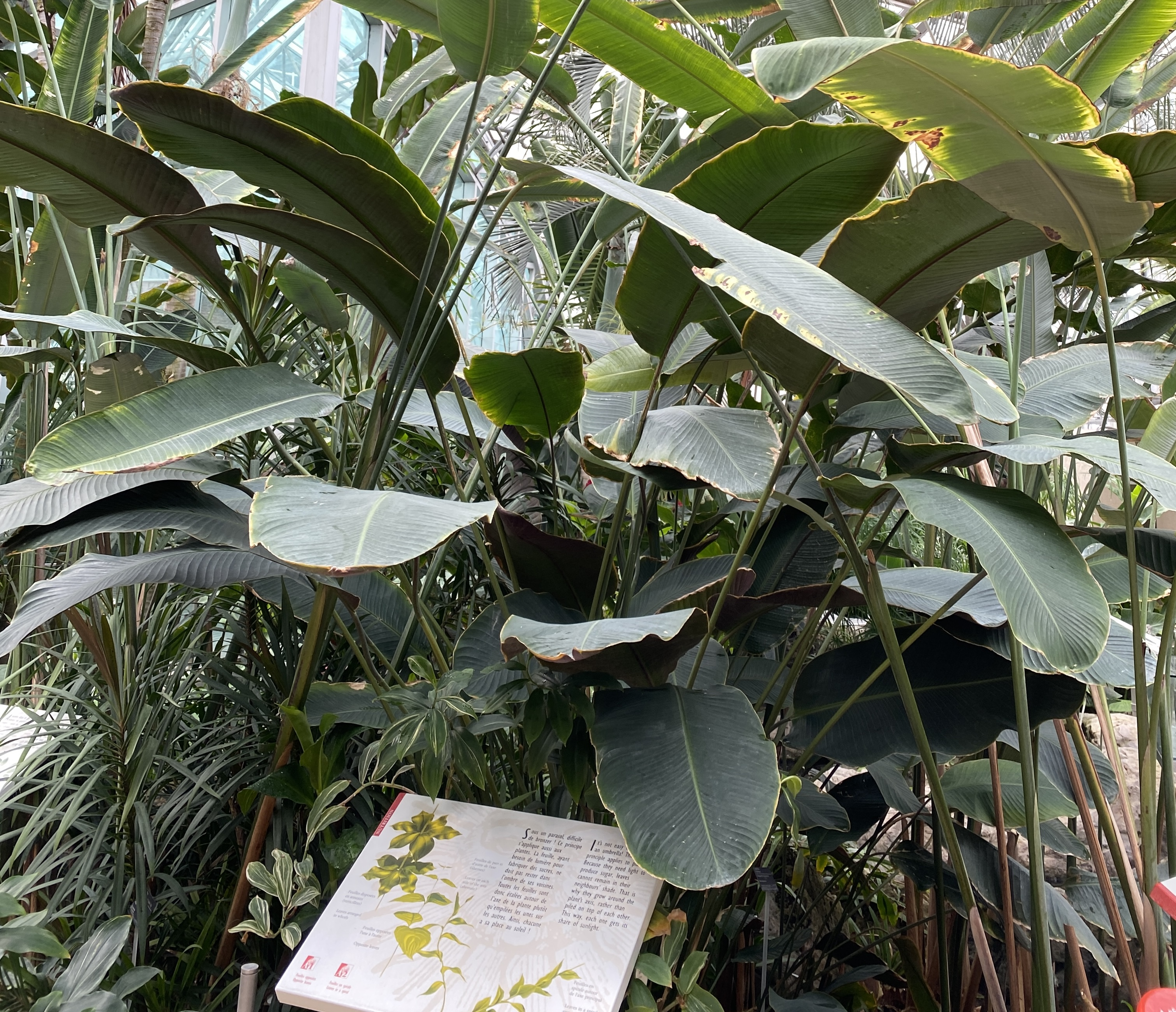
Goeppertia inocephala leaves
