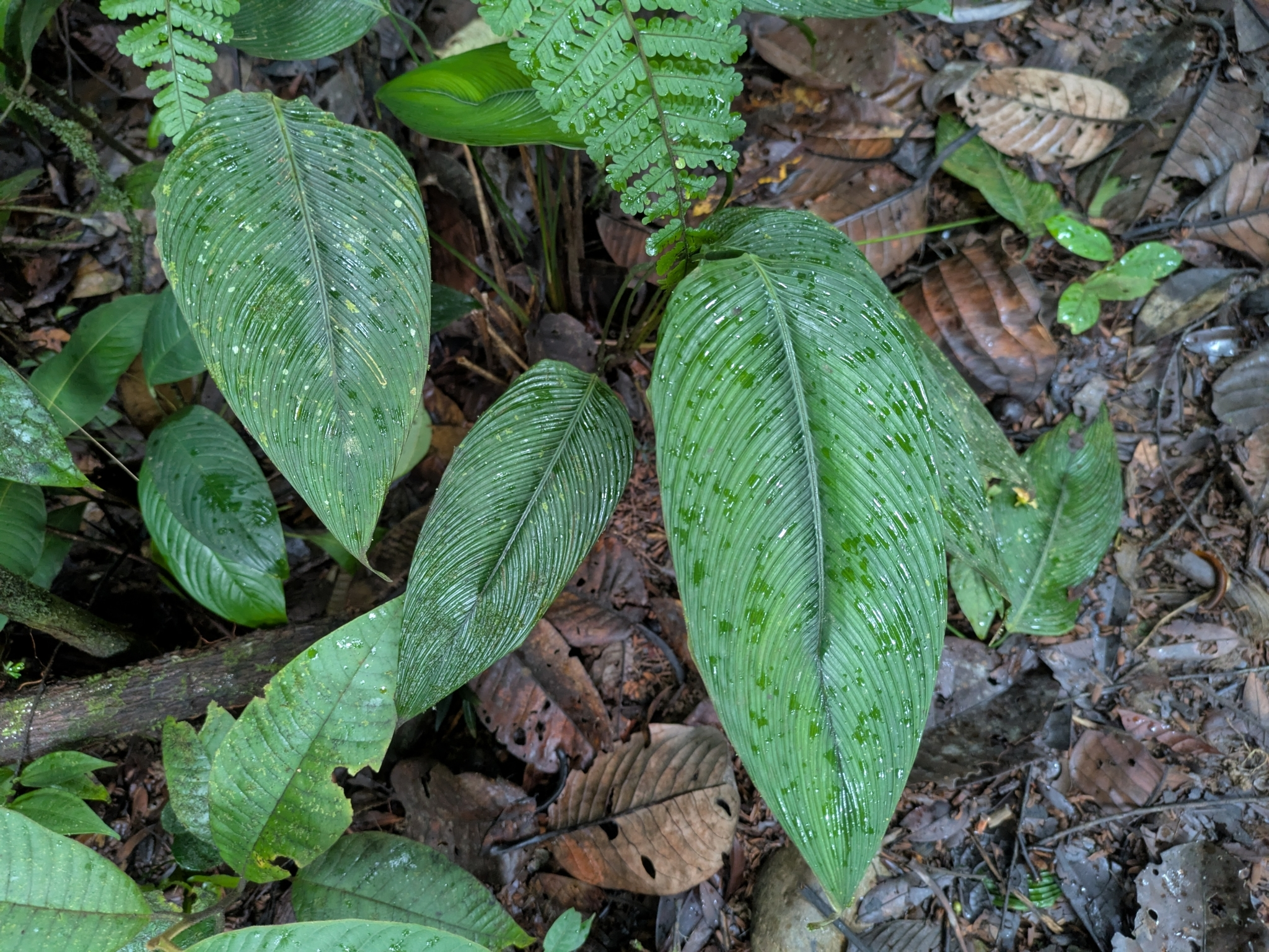

Scientific classification
- Kingdom: Plantae
- Clade: Tracheophytes
- Clade: Angiosperms
- Clade: Monocots
- Clade: Commelinids
- Order: Zingiberales
- Family: Marantaceae
- Genus: Goeppertia
- Species: G. nidulans

Binomial name
- Goeppertia nidulans (L.B.Sm. & Idrobo) Borchs. & S.Suárez

Synonyms
- Calathea nidulans

= Goeppertia nidulans =

Species of flowering plant

Goeppertia nidulans is a rare species of plant in the genus Goeppertia of the family Marantaceae. The native range of this species is Colombia. It is a perennial and grows primarily in the wet tropical biome.

== Description ==
Leaves are 33–53 cm (13–21 in) long and have a petiole. The upper part of the petiole is about 2.5 cm (1 in). The leaf is up to 31 cm (12 in) long and 14 cm (5.5 in) wide, uneven on the two sides, and shaped ovate-lanceolate to ovate-oblong. The tip is long and pointed, and the base is broadly rounded on both sides. The underside of the leaf is hairless and densely covered with small bumps, while the upper surface is slightly shiny with clearly visible secondary veins. The inflorescence is shaped like a spike on a short peduncle. The bracts are arranged in a spiral, elliptic, pointed, hairless, and up to 5 cm (2 in) long. Flowers likely occur in pairs of two. Prophylla and bracteoles are absent. The sepals are narrow, lance-shaped, slightly pointed, and about 8 mm (0.31 in) long. The seeds are about 7 mm (0.28 in) long.

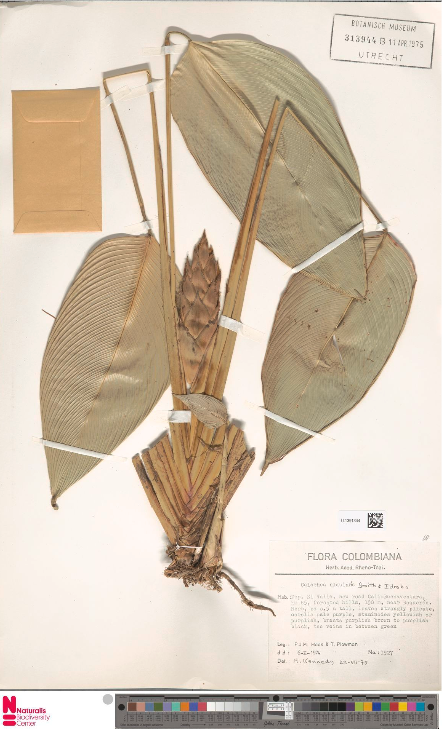
Herbaria of Goeppertia nidulans

== Distribution ==
This species is native to Colombia. It only appears in a very specific area, near Buenaventura, in "Valle del Cauca". It grows in altitude around 20 to 400 m (66 to 1,312 ft). It is a rare species that is not in cultivation right now and can only be found in the wild.

Goeppertia nidulans is considered a non-threatened species, meaning it is not endangered.

== Taxonomy ==
This species was first published under the name Calathea nidulans in the journal Caldasia in 1948. It was discovered by Lyman B. Smith and Jesus M. Idrobo, who also discovered Goeppertia killipii. In 2012, a study published by Finn Borchsenius and Luzz Stella Suárez in the journal Systematic Botany suggested a reclassification of a lot of species of the genus Calathea in the genus Goeppertia. The study was supported by a molecular phylogeny among different species of Calathea. Goeppertia nidulans was first cited in this study, listed as one of the species now belonging to the genus Goeppertia.
