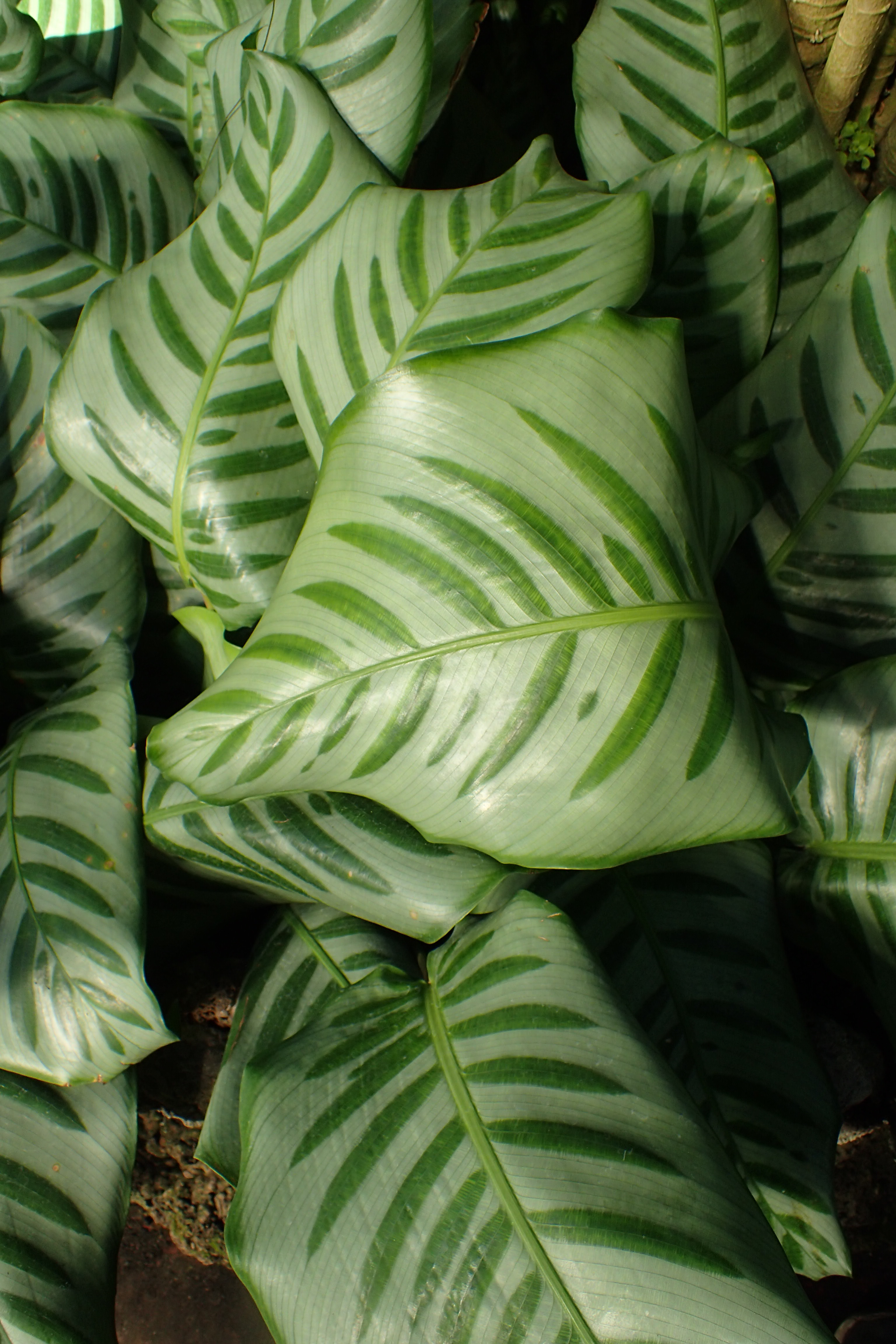

Scientific classification
- Kingdom: Plantae
- Clade: Embryophytes
- Clade: Tracheophytes
- Clade: Angiosperms
- Clade: Monocots
- Clade: Commelinids
- Order: Zingiberales
- Family: Marantaceae
- Genus: Goeppertia
- Species: G. kegeljanii

Binomial name
- Goeppertia kegeljanii (É.Morren) Saka

Synonyms
- List: Maranta kegeljanii É.Morren; Calathea bella (W.Bull) Regel; Calathea cardiophylla K.Schum.; Calathea musaica (W.Bull) L.H.Bailey; Goeppertia bella (W.Bull) Borchs. & S.Suárez; Maranta bella W.Bull; Maranta closonii Jacob-Makoy; Maranta musaica W.Bull; Maranta tessellata É.Morren; Phyllodes bella (W.Bull) Kuntze

= Goeppertia kegeljanii =

Species of plant

Goeppertia kegeljanii is a species of flowering plant in the family Marantaceae. Native to Espírito Santo in Brazil, it is commonly also known by its synonym Calathea mosaica in the houseplant trade, due to the mosaic-like patterning on its leaves. As an ornamental plant, it is noted for its light green, oval leaves with a fine venation of yellow.

== Cultivars ==
The following list of cultivars is incomplete.

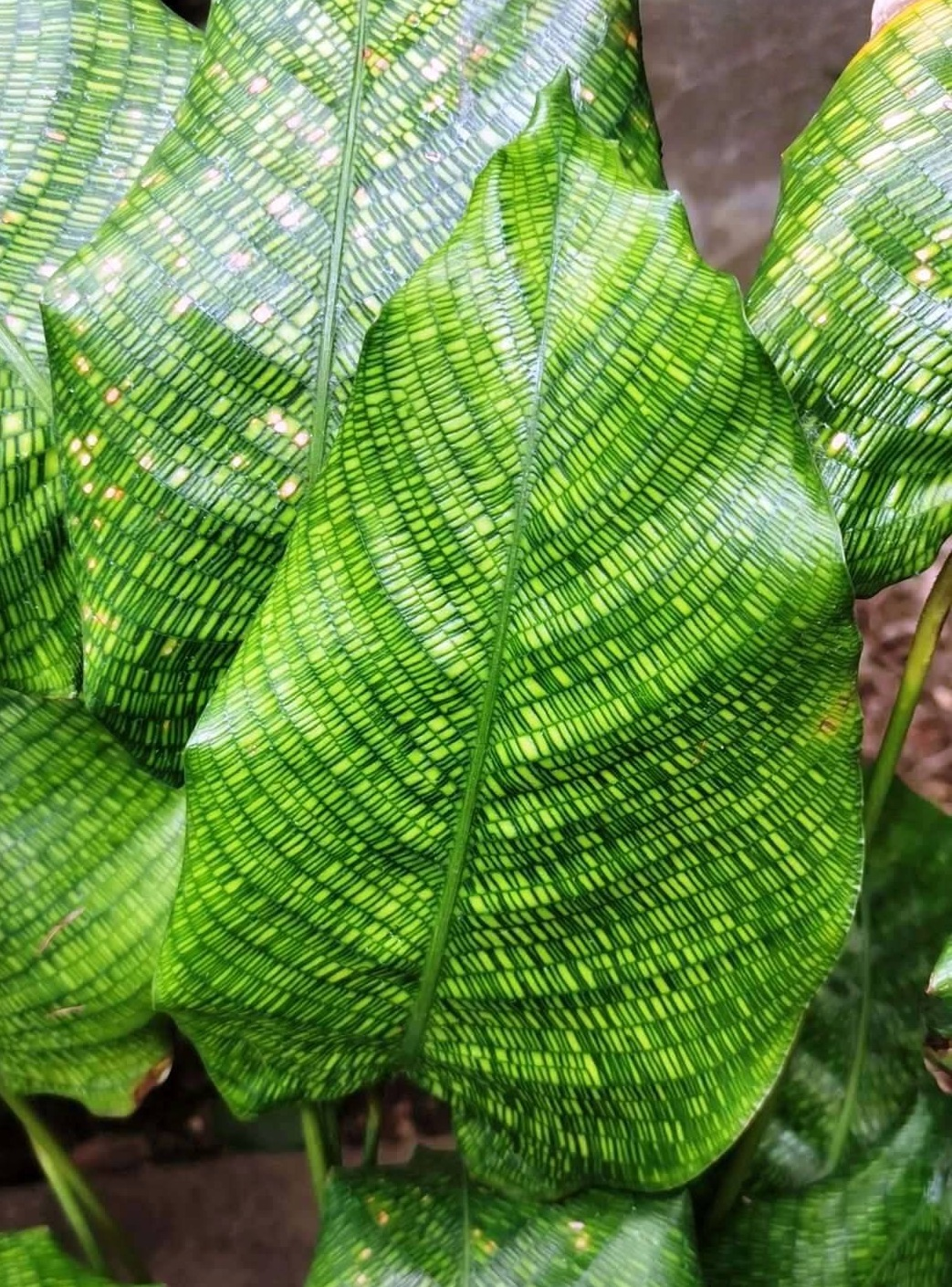
The variety "network" is popular in gardens

- G. kegeljanii 'Network'
