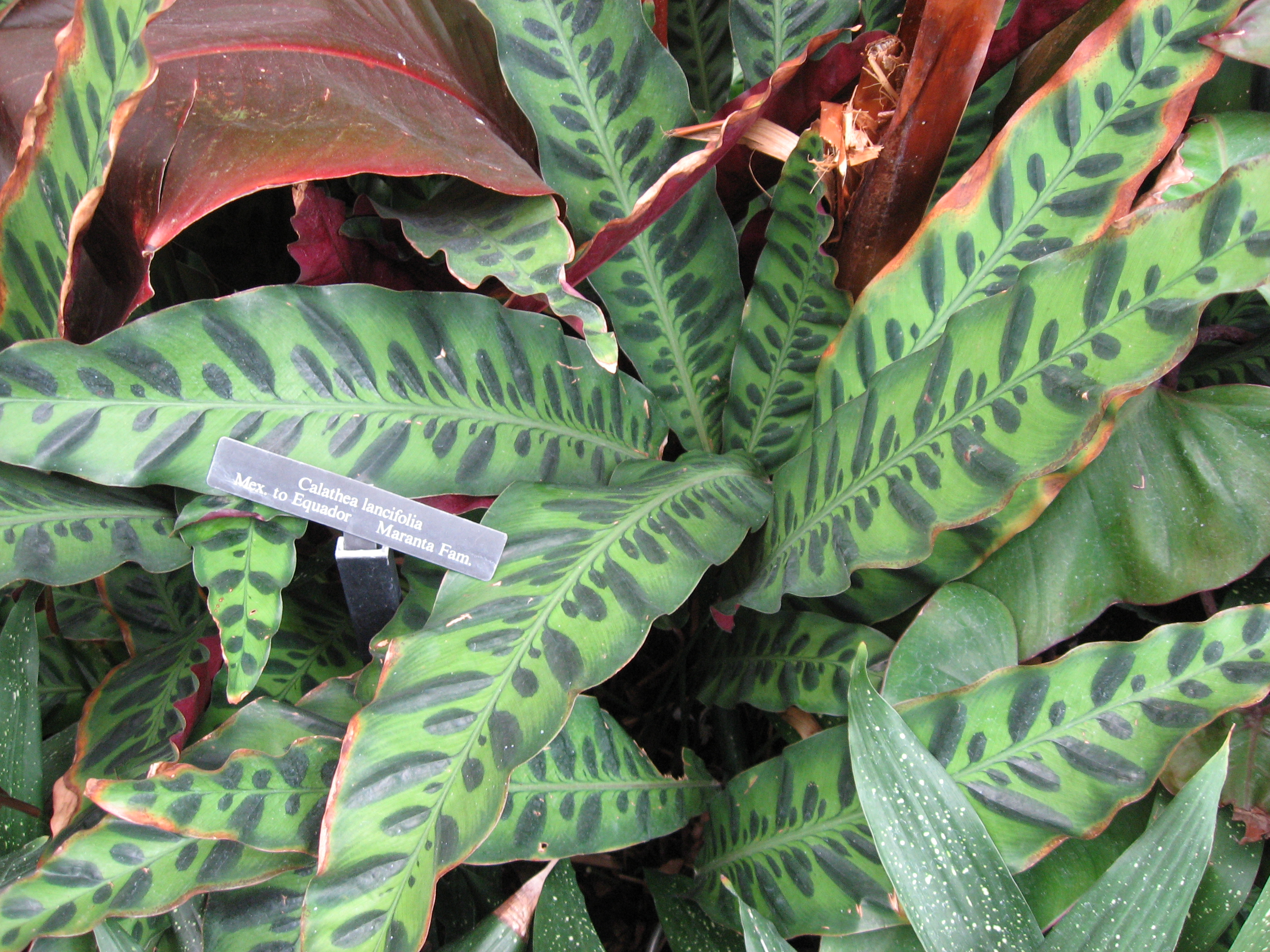

Scientific classification
- Kingdom: Plantae
- Clade: Tracheophytes
- Clade: Angiosperms
- Clade: Monocots
- Clade: Commelinids
- Order: Zingiberales
- Family: Marantaceae
- Genus: Goeppertia
- Species: G. insignis

Binomial name
- Goeppertia insignis (W.Bull ex W.E.Marshall) J.M.A.Braga, L.J.T.Cardoso & R.Couto

Synonyms
- Calathea insignis (W.Bull ex W.E.Marshall) W.Bull; Calathea lancifolia Boom; Goeppertia lancifolia (Boom) Borchs. & S.Suárez; Maranta insignis W.Bull ex W.E.Marshall

= Goeppertia insignis =

Species of flowering plant

Goeppertia insignis (syn. Calathea lancifolia, Goeppertia lancifolia), the rattlesnake plant, is a species of flowering plant in the Marantaceae family, native to Rio de Janeiro state in Brazil.

It is an evergreen perennial, growing to 60–75 cm (24–30 in), with slender pale green leaves to 45 cm (18 in), heavily marked above with dark blotches, purple below.

In the Peruvian Amazon, the plant is used for wrapping brown sugar.

== Cultivation ==
Goeppertia insignis prefers indirect sunlight. These plants want well-drained, but moist, soil. They like a pH of 6.1 to 7.3. The plant requires a minimum temperature of 16 °C (61 °F), and it is commonly used as a houseplant in temperate regions.

== Leaves ==
The bottom side of the leaves are purple, with the adaxial surface having what look like dark green alternating large and small leaflets overlaid on the light green leaf. Like other prayer plants, its leaves fold together at night, and unfold again in the morning.
