= Finn Borchsenius =

Danish botanist (born 1959)

Finn Borchsenius (born 1959) is a Danish botanist, with interest in spermatophytes. He is an expert of the Arecaceae, or palm family.

Borchsenius earned a PhD from Aarhus University in 1992. In 1991, he became assistant professor in the Department of Systematic Botany at Aarhus University, and since 1997 he has been associate professor there. He also manages the herbarium at Aarhus University. Borchsenius previously worked as vice-dean for education at the Faculty of Technical Sciences and the Faculty of Science and Technology at Aarhus University. From 1992 to 1994, he served as Director of the Herbarium at the Pontifical Catholic University of Ecuador.
