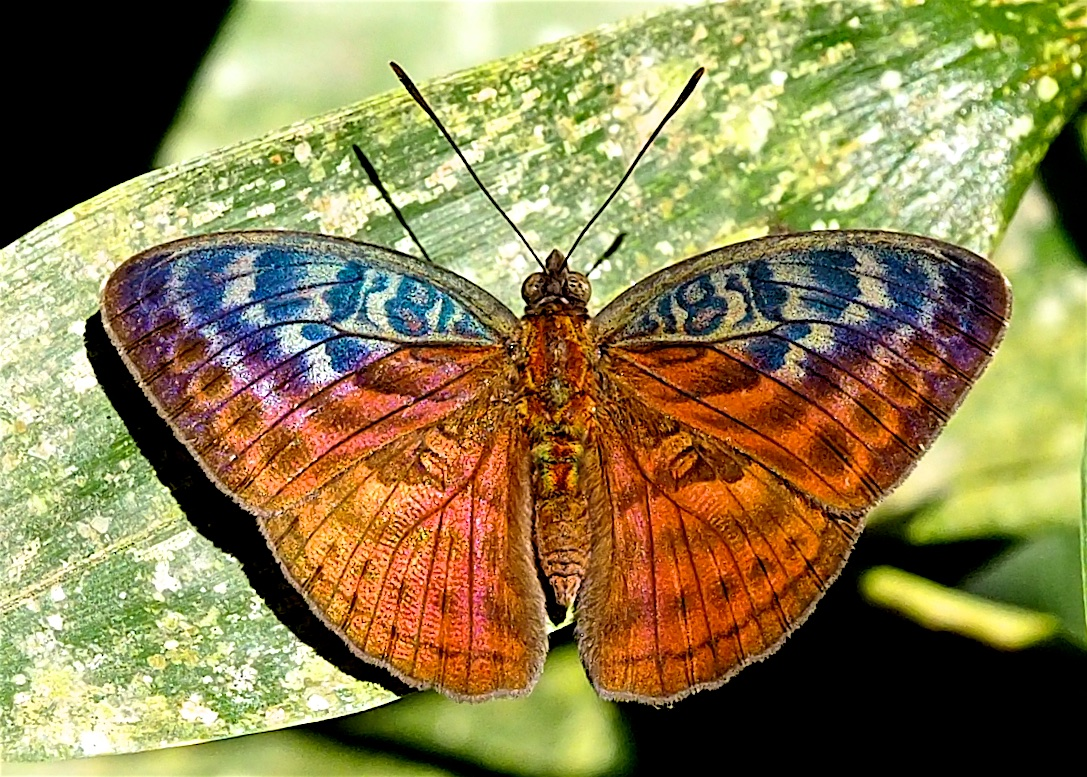
- male
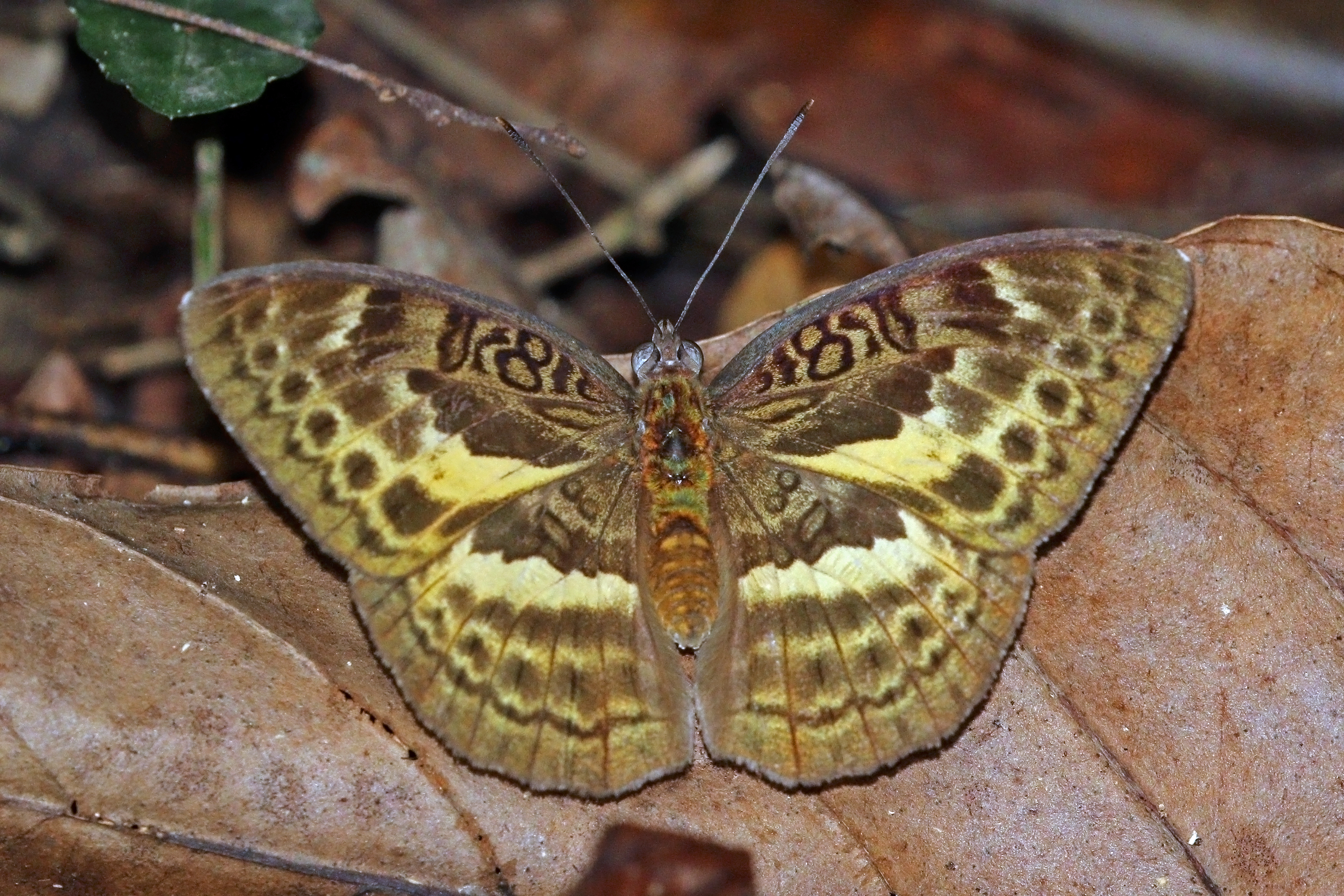
- female, Kakum National Park, Ghana

Scientific classification
- Kingdom: Animalia
- Phylum: Arthropoda
- Clade: Pancrustacea
- Class: Insecta
- Order: Lepidoptera
- Family: Nymphalidae
- Genus: Bebearia
- Species: B. tentyris

Binomial name
- Bebearia tentyris (Hewitson, 1866)

Synonyms
- Euryphene tentyris Hewitson, 1866; Bebearia (Apectinaria) tentyris; Euryphene calabarensis Felder and Felder, 1867; Euryphene tentyris var. seeldrayersi Aurivillius, 1899

= Bebearia tentyris =

Species of butterfly

Bebearia tentyris, or Hewitson's forester, is a butterfly in the family Nymphalidae. It is found in Ivory Coast, Ghana, Togo, Nigeria, Cameroon, the Republic of the Congo, the Democratic Republic of the Congo and Uganda. The habitat consists of forests, especially drier forests.

The male may be at once known by the upperside of the forewing having along the costal margin a broad bluish green reflection, so that the ground-colour appears light green and the dark spots dark green; the greenish colour is posteriorly sharply bounded by vein 2 and distally scarcely reaches the fourth transverse band; the ground-colour of the upper surface is otherwise dark yellow-brown and the dark transverse bands conspicuous; the under surface is grey-brown and characterized by a quadrate snow-white spot before the middle of cellule 7 on the hindwing. The female is very similar to that of carshena and has like it a yellow hindmarginal spot on the forewing, but this is narrower and extends somewhat into cellule 2; the median band of the hindwing is anteriorly somewhat broader, about 6 mm. in cellule 5. Sierra Leone to Angola. — seeldrayersi Auriv. differs in having the wings in the male is entirely dark blue above with indistinct markings, but beneath they are as in the type-form, only somewhat more grey, while in the female the light yellow hindmarginal spot on the forewing is divided by a black transverse line. Is perhaps an independent species. In the interior of the Congo region.

The larvae feed on Hypselodelphys species.

== Subspecies ==
- Bebearia tentyris tentyris (Ivory Coast, Ghana, Togo, Nigeria, Cameroon)
- Bebearia tentyris seeldrayersi (Aurivillius, 1899) (Congo, western Democratic Republic of the Congo, Uganda)

Torben Larsen developed a species numbering system for his 2005 publication Butterflies of West Africa. The nominate subspecies is #995. The 'Larsen' numbers have since been used with permission in A Sharp Eye on Butterflies of Ghana.
