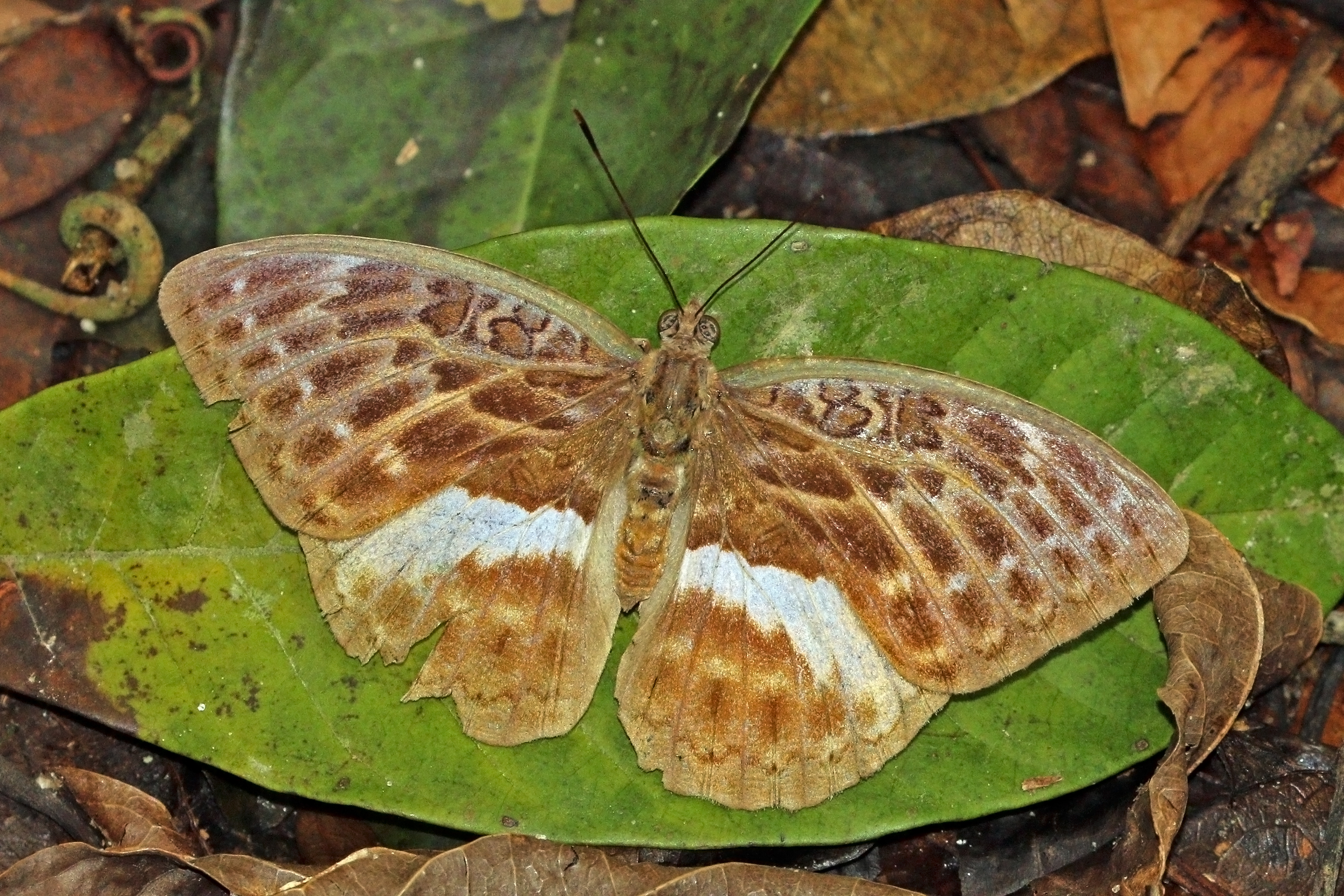
- female B. m. mandinga Kakum National Park, Ghana

Scientific classification
- Kingdom: Animalia
- Phylum: Arthropoda
- Clade: Pancrustacea
- Class: Insecta
- Order: Lepidoptera
- Family: Nymphalidae
- Genus: Bebearia
- Species: B. mandinga

Binomial name
- Bebearia mandinga (Felder & Felder, 1860)

Synonyms
- Euryphene mandinga Felder & Felder, 1860; Bebearia (Apectinaria) mandinga

= Bebearia mandinga =

Species of butterfly

Bebearia mandinga, the Mandinga forester, is a butterfly in the family Nymphalidae. It is found in Guinea, Sierra Leone, Liberia, Ivory Coast, Ghana, Togo, Nigeria, Cameroon, Gabon, the Republic of the Congo, the Central African Republic, the Democratic Republic of the Congo and Uganda. The habitat consists of forests.

E. mandinga Fldr. (41 d) differs [from other Bebearia] beneath in both sexes in the yellow-grey or whitish grey basal half of both wings, which is chequered with large, angular black-grey spots; the dark spots are placed chiefly in the basal part of cellules 1—6. In the male the wings are bright orange above, somewhat darker than in Bebearia zonara and with the dark spots somewhat larger but still free. The female exactly agrees with that of zonara above. Senegal to Congo.

The larvae feed on Hypselodelphys species, including H. scandens.

== Subspecies ==
- Bebearia mandinga mandinga (Guinea, Sierra Leone, Liberia, Ivory Coast, Ghana, Togo, Nigeria, Cameroon, Gabon, Congo, the Central African Republic, the Democratic Republic of the Congo)
- Bebearia mandinga beni Hecq, 1990 (eastern Democratic Republic of the Congo, Uganda: Semuliki National Park, Toro)

Torben Larsen developed a species numbering system for his 2005 publication Butterflies of West Africa. The nominate subspecies is #1002. The 'Larsen' numbers have since been used with permission in A Sharp Eye on Butterflies of Ghana.
