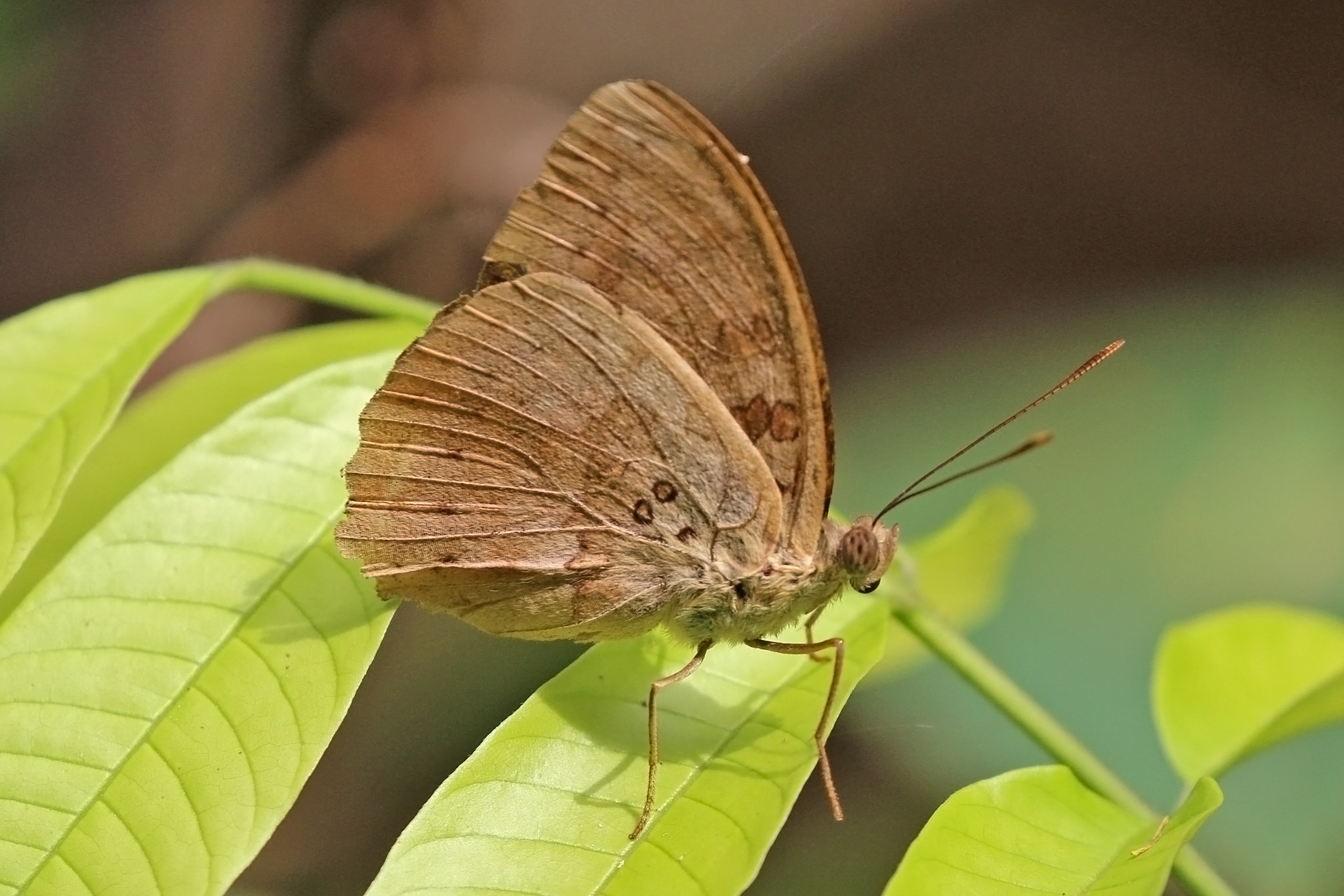
- Kakum National Park, Ghana

Scientific classification
- Kingdom: Animalia
- Phylum: Arthropoda
- Clade: Pancrustacea
- Class: Insecta
- Order: Lepidoptera
- Family: Nymphalidae
- Genus: Bebearia
- Species: B. absolon

Binomial name
- Bebearia absolon (Fabricius, 1793)

Synonyms
- Papilio absolon Fabricius, 1793; Bebearia (Apectinaria) absolon; Euryphene candida Capronnier, 1889; Euryphene entebbiae Lathy, 1906

= Bebearia absolon =

Species of butterfly

Bebearia absolon, the Absolon forester, is a butterfly in the family Nymphalidae. It is found in Guinea, Sierra Leone, Liberia, Ivory Coast, Ghana, Nigeria, Cameroon, Gabon, the Republic of the Congo, the Central African Republic, the Democratic Republic of the Congo, Uganda and Tanzania. The habitat consists of forests.

Both wings in the male with yellow-brown ground-colour above and continuous or nearly continuous dark transverse bands, beneath with yellow-grey or grey-brown ground-colour without large blackish markings and without dark oblique line in the apex of the forewing. The female above very similar to that of zonara, but beneath without dark oblique line in the apex of the forewing.

- absolon F. (41 d, f). Wings above in the without blue reflection. Cameroons to the Congo.
- micans Auriv. The wings of the male when viewed obliquely from the side, have a bright blue reflection above and are somewhat darker on both surfaces than in the type-form. Cameroons and Congo. Treated as a species Bebearia micans by Hecq.
- entebbiae Lathy is somewhat larger and even darker than micans, but seems otherwise entirely to agree with it; it is not mentioned whether the wings have a blue reflection above or not. Uganda.

The larvae feed on Trachyphrynium and Hypselodelphys species.

== Subspecies ==
- Bebearia absolon absolon (eastern Guinea, Sierra Leone, Liberia, Ivory Coast, Ghana, Nigeria, Cameroon, Gabon, Congo, Central African Republic, Democratic Republic of the Congo: Mayumbe, Ubangi, Mongala, Uele, Ituri, northern Kivu, Tshopo, Tshuapa, Equateur, Kinshasa, Kasai, Sankuru and Lualaba)
- Bebearia absolon entebbiae (Lathy, 1906) (Uganda, north-western Tanzania)

Torben Larsen developed a species numbering system for his 2005 publication Butterflies of West Africa. The nominate subspecies is #999. The 'Larsen' numbers have since been used with permission in A Sharp Eye on Butterflies of Ghana.

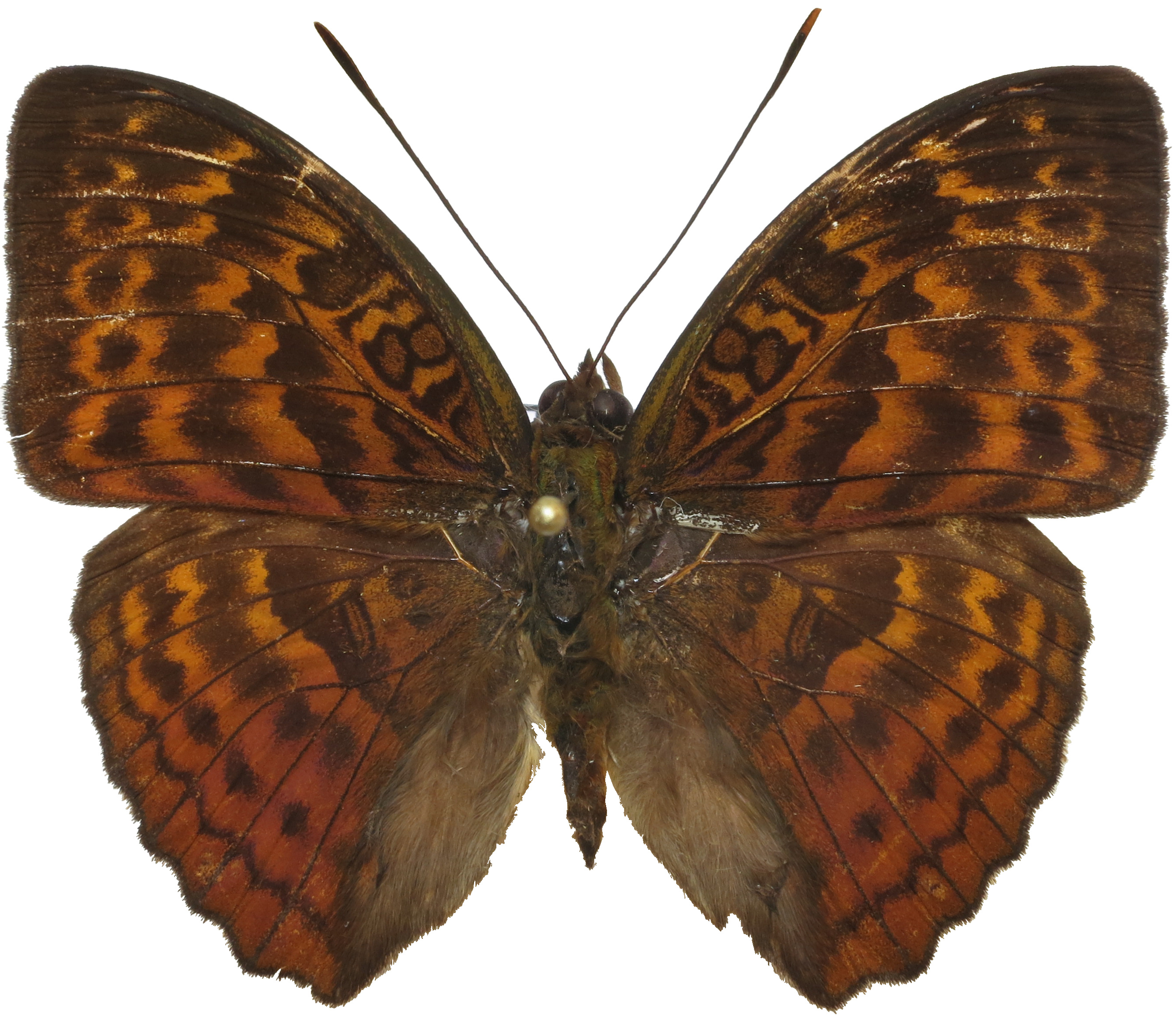
Male, Mbalmayo, Cameroon

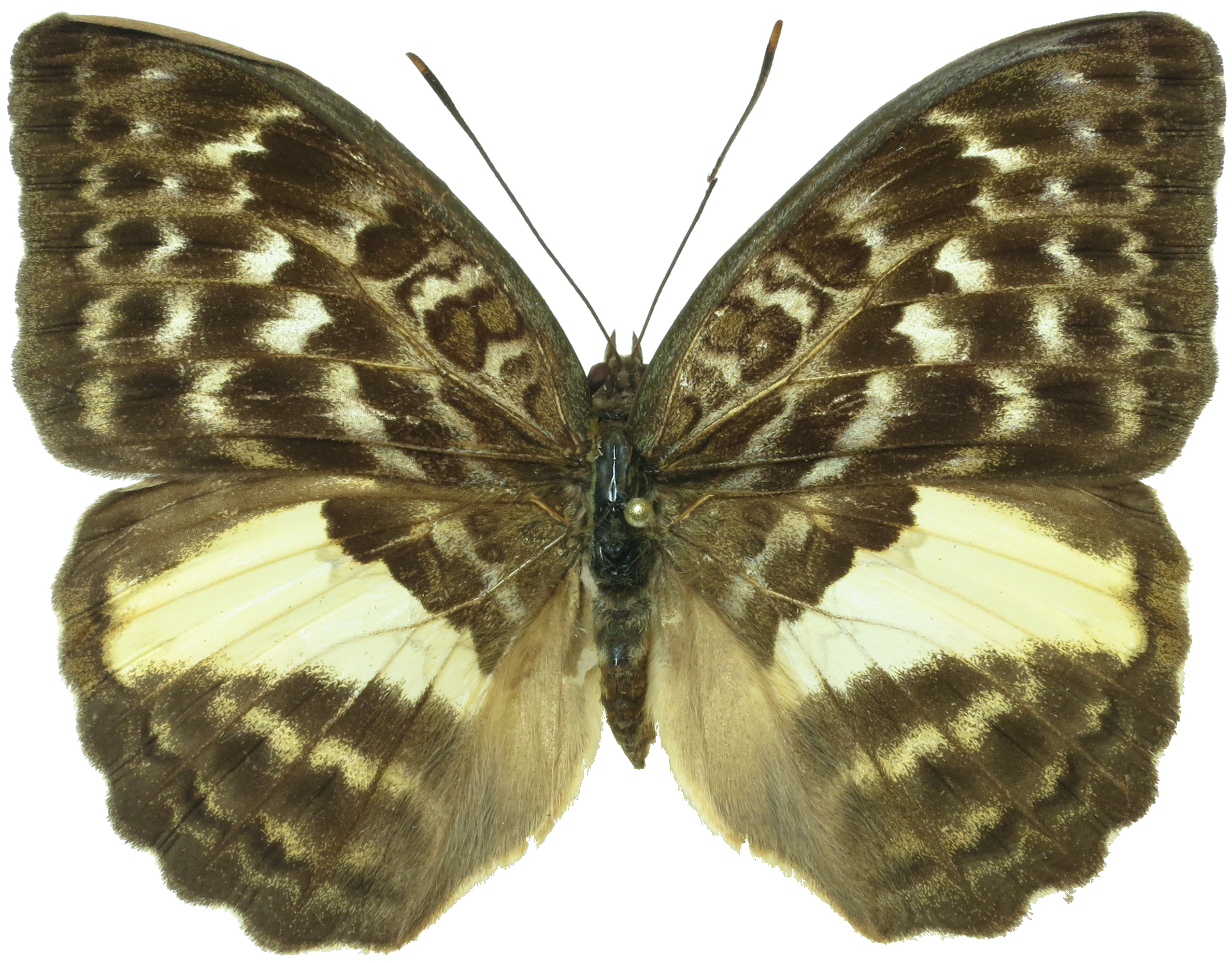
Female, Mbalmayo, Cameroon
