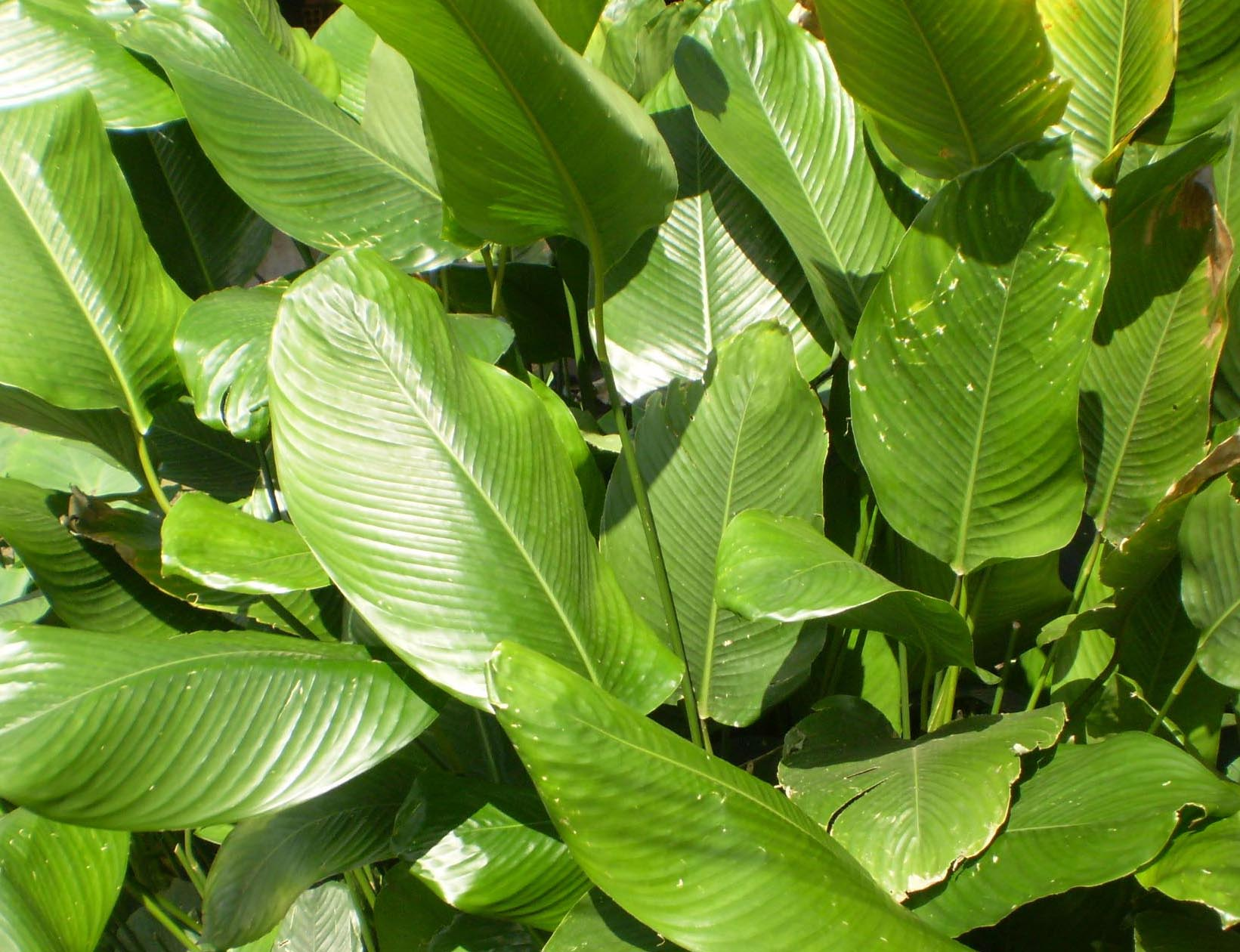
- Semi-cultivated leaves

Scientific classification
- Kingdom: Plantae
- Clade: Tracheophytes
- Clade: Angiosperms
- Clade: Monocots
- Clade: Commelinids
- Order: Zingiberales
- Family: Marantaceae
- Genus: Stachyphrynium
- Species: S. placentarium

Binomial name
- Stachyphrynium placentarium (Lour.) Clausager & Borchs.

Synonyms
- Phyllodes placentaria Lour. Phyllodes densiflora (Blume) Kuntze; Phrynium tetranthum K.Schum. Phrynium sinicum Miq. Phrynium placentarium (Lour.) Merr. Phrynium parviflorum Roxb. Phrynium glabrum Ridl. Phrynium densiflorum Moritzi; Phrynium densiflorum Blume; Maranta placentaria (Lour.) A.Dietr. Maranta parviflora (Roxb.) A.Dietr.

= Stachyphrynium placentarium =

Species of plant

Stachyphrynium placentarium is a species of flowering plant in the family Marantaceae. Its basionym was Phyllodes placentaria Lour. and was subsequently placed as various species in the genus Phrynium. No subspecies are listed in the Catalogue of Life.

== Distribution ==
The species is widespread throughout Asia and is native to Assam, Bangladesh, Borneo, Cambodia, South-Central and Southeast China, East Himalaya, Hainan, India, Java, the Lesser Sunda Islands, Malaysia, Myanmar, Nepal, the Philippines, Sumatra, Thailand, Tibet, and Vietnam.

== Uses ==
The leaves of this species, lá dong, are notably used throughout Việt Nam as a wrapping for food items: especially bánh chưng (the glutinous rice cake consumed at Tết) and bánh tẻ. Species in the similar genus Phrynium, including P. pubinerve (dong gân lông) may also be used for this purpose. S. placentarium leaves are used for food wrapping in Việt Nam:

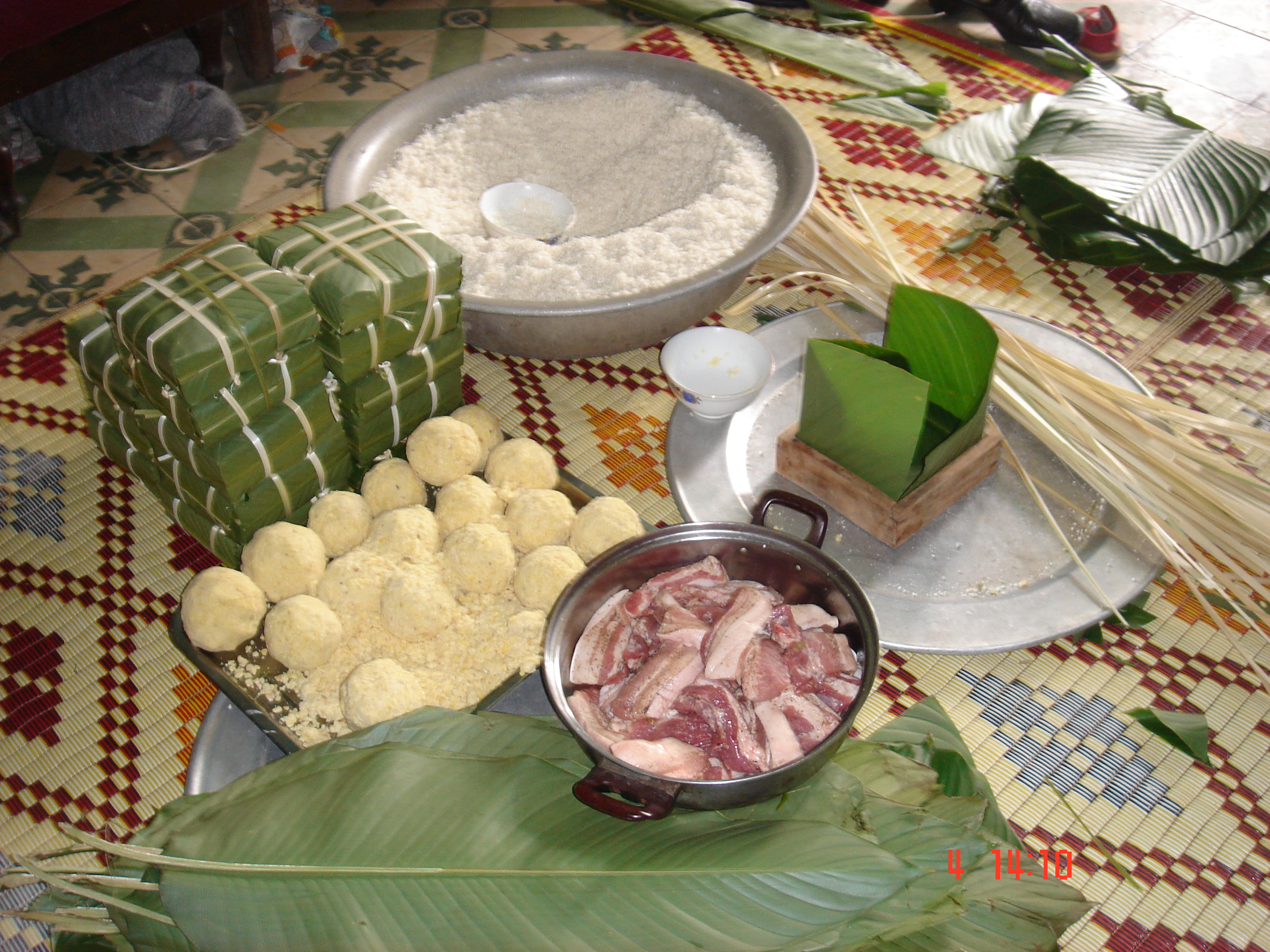
Bánh chưng

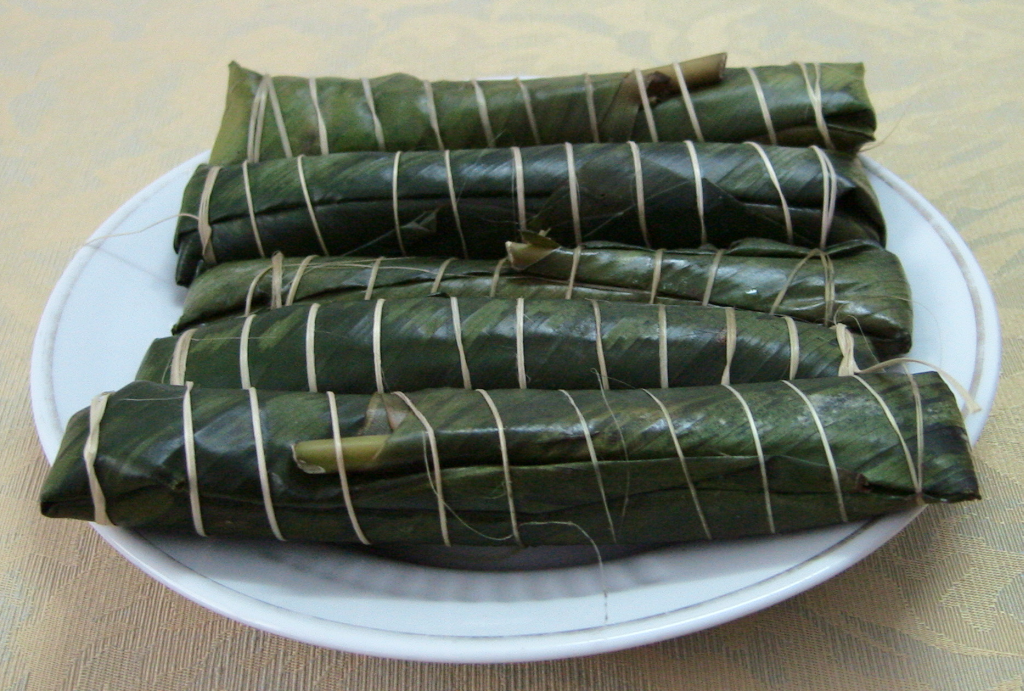
Bánh tẻ

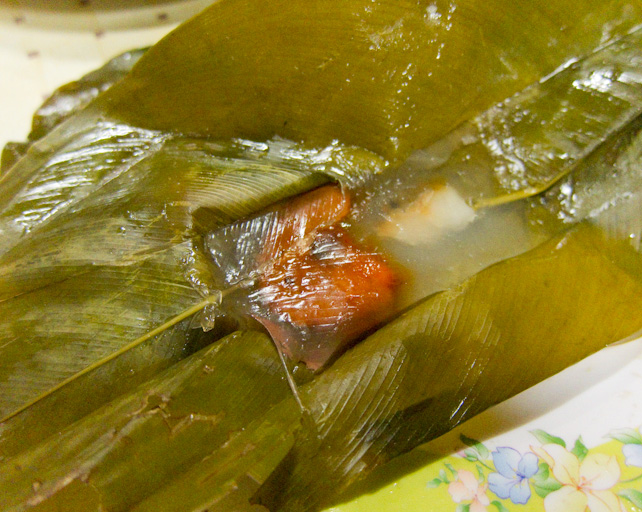
Bánh bột lọc
