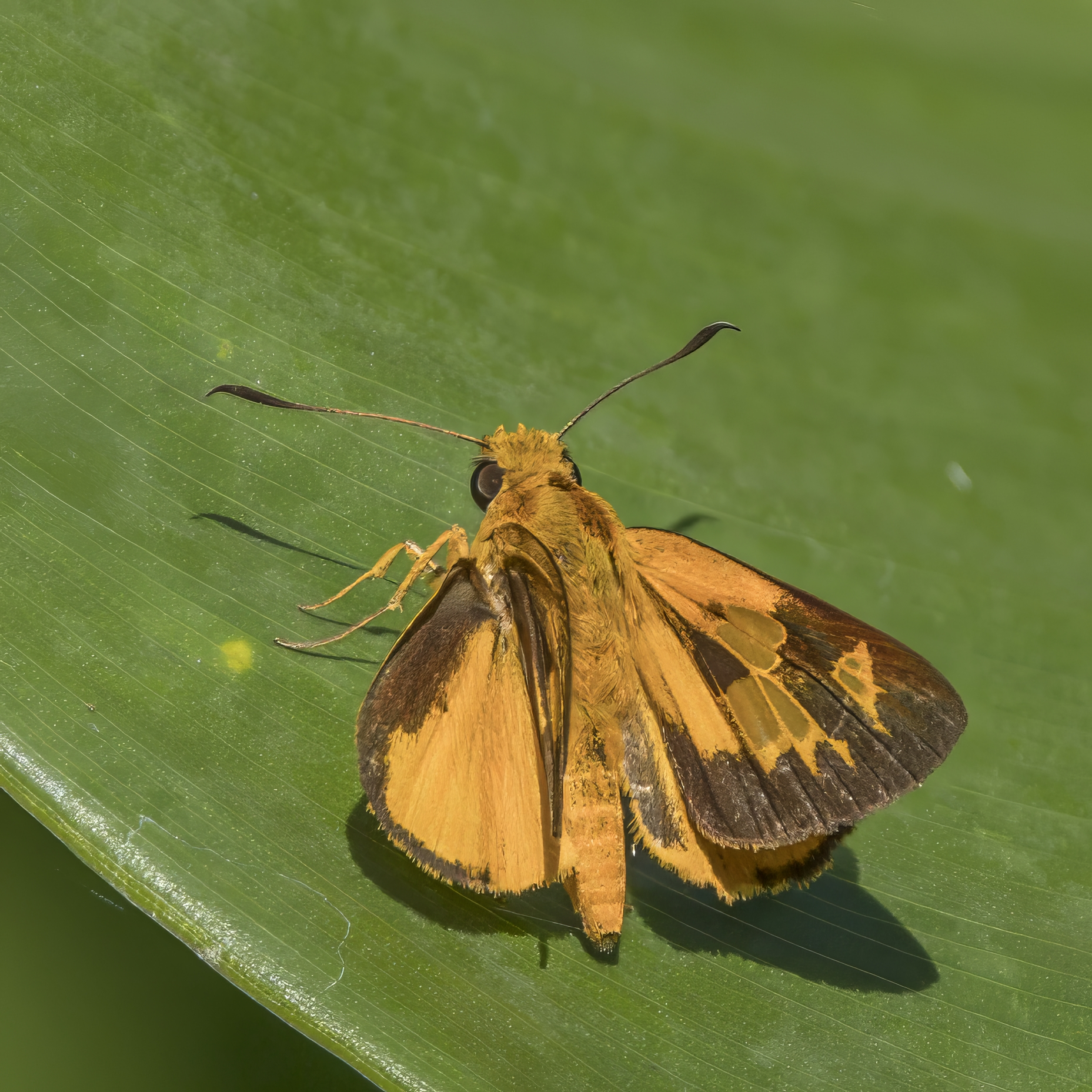

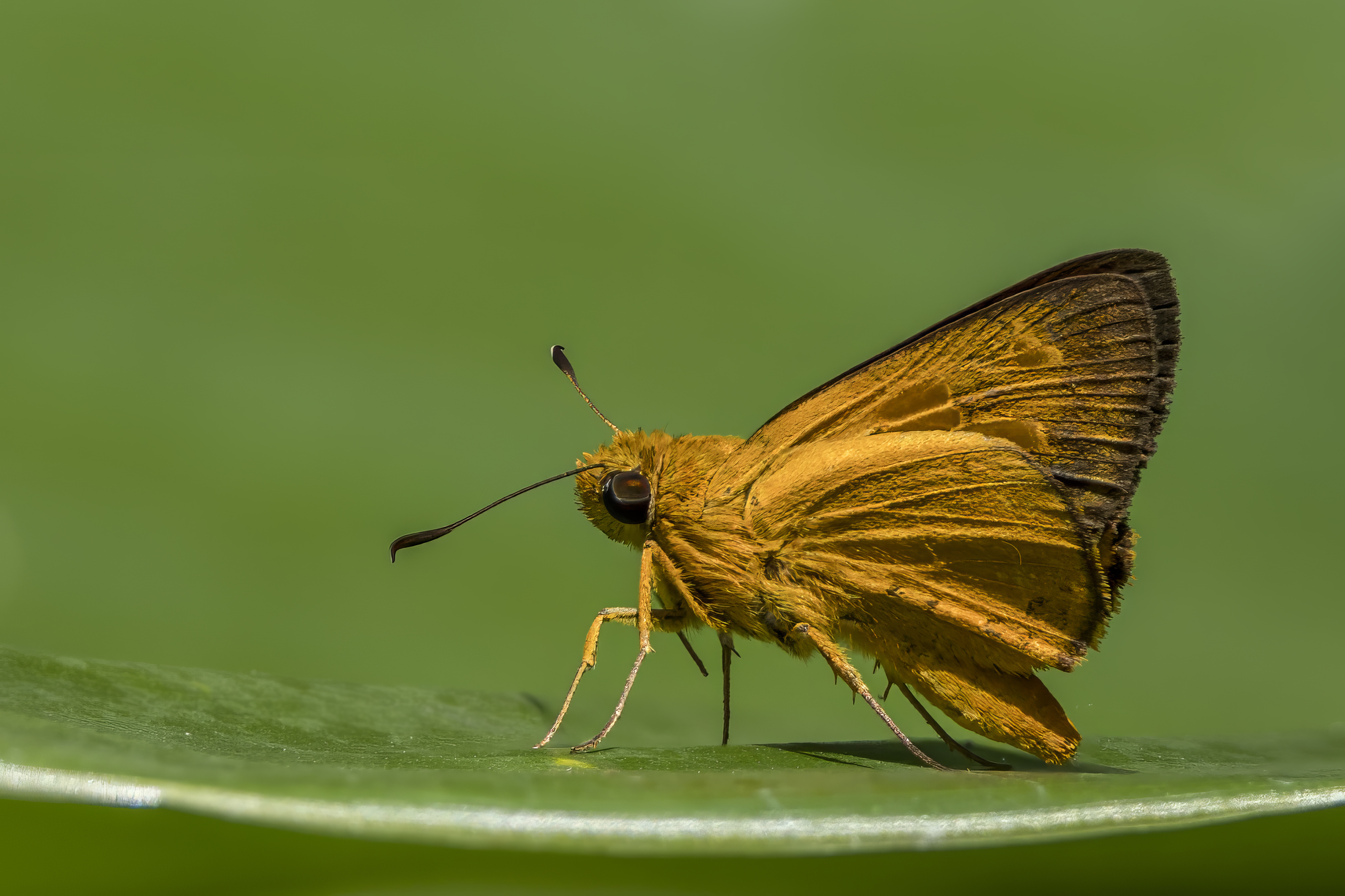
- Both images of same male in Ghana

Scientific classification
- Kingdom: Animalia
- Phylum: Arthropoda
- Clade: Pancrustacea
- Class: Insecta
- Order: Lepidoptera
- Family: Hesperiidae
- Genus: Xanthonymus
- Species: X. astrape

Binomial name
- Xanthonymus astrape (Holland, 1892)

Synonyms
- List: Pardaleodes astrape Holland, 1892; Pardaleodes parcus Karsch, 1893; Pardaleodes eurydice Aurivillius, 1925; Xanthodisca astrape (Holland, 1892)

= Xanthonymus astrape =

Species of butterfly

Xanthonymus astrape, the false pathfinder skipper, is a species of butterfly in the family Hesperiidae. It is found in Sierra Leone, Liberia, Ivory Coast, Ghana, Togo, Nigeria, Cameroon, Equatorial Guinea, Gabon, the Republic of the Congo, the Central African Republic, the Democratic Republic of the Congo and Uganda. The habitat consists of the edges of forests and forest clearings.

Adults of both sexes are attracted to flowers.

The larvae feed on Trachyphrynium braunianum.

Torben Larsen developed a species numbering system for his 2005 publication Butterflies of West Africa. This species is #1318. The 'Larsen' numbers have since been used with permission in A Sharp Eye on Butterflies of Ghana.
