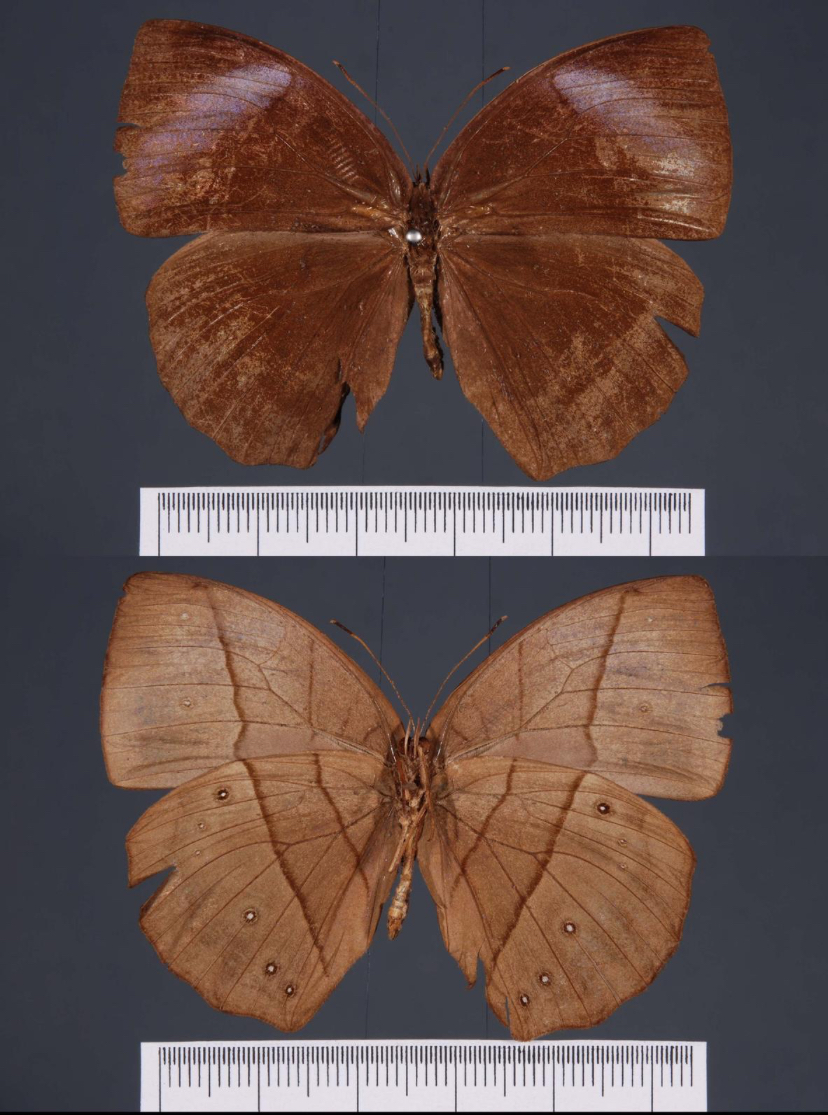

Scientific classification
- Kingdom: Animalia
- Phylum: Arthropoda
- Clade: Pancrustacea
- Class: Insecta
- Order: Lepidoptera
- Family: Nymphalidae
- Genus: Bicyclus
- Species: B. ephorus

Binomial name
- Bicyclus ephorus Weymer, 1892

= Bicyclus ephorus =

Common blue-banded bush brown

Species of butterfly

Bicyclus ephorus, the common blue-banded bush brown, is a butterfly in the family Nymphalidae. It is found in Guinea, Sierra Leone, Liberia, Ivory Coast, Ghana, Nigeria, Cameroon, the Republic of the Congo, the Central African Republic and the Democratic Republic of the Congo.

B. ephorus differs from B. iccius only in having the eye-spots on the under surface small or punctiform.

The habitat consists of forests.

Adults are attracted to fermented fruit.

The larvae feed on Trachyphrynium species.

== Subspecies ==
- Bicyclus ephorus ephorus (Guinea, Sierra Leone, Liberia, Ivory Coast, Ghana, Nigeria)
- Bicyclus ephorus bergeri Condamin, 1965 (Cameroon, Congo, Central African Republic, northern Democratic Republic of the Congo)
