= Donax =

Donax is the scientific name of two genera of organisms and may refer to:

- Donax (bivalve), a genus of clams in the family Donacidae
- Donax (plant), a genus of plants in the family Marantaceae
