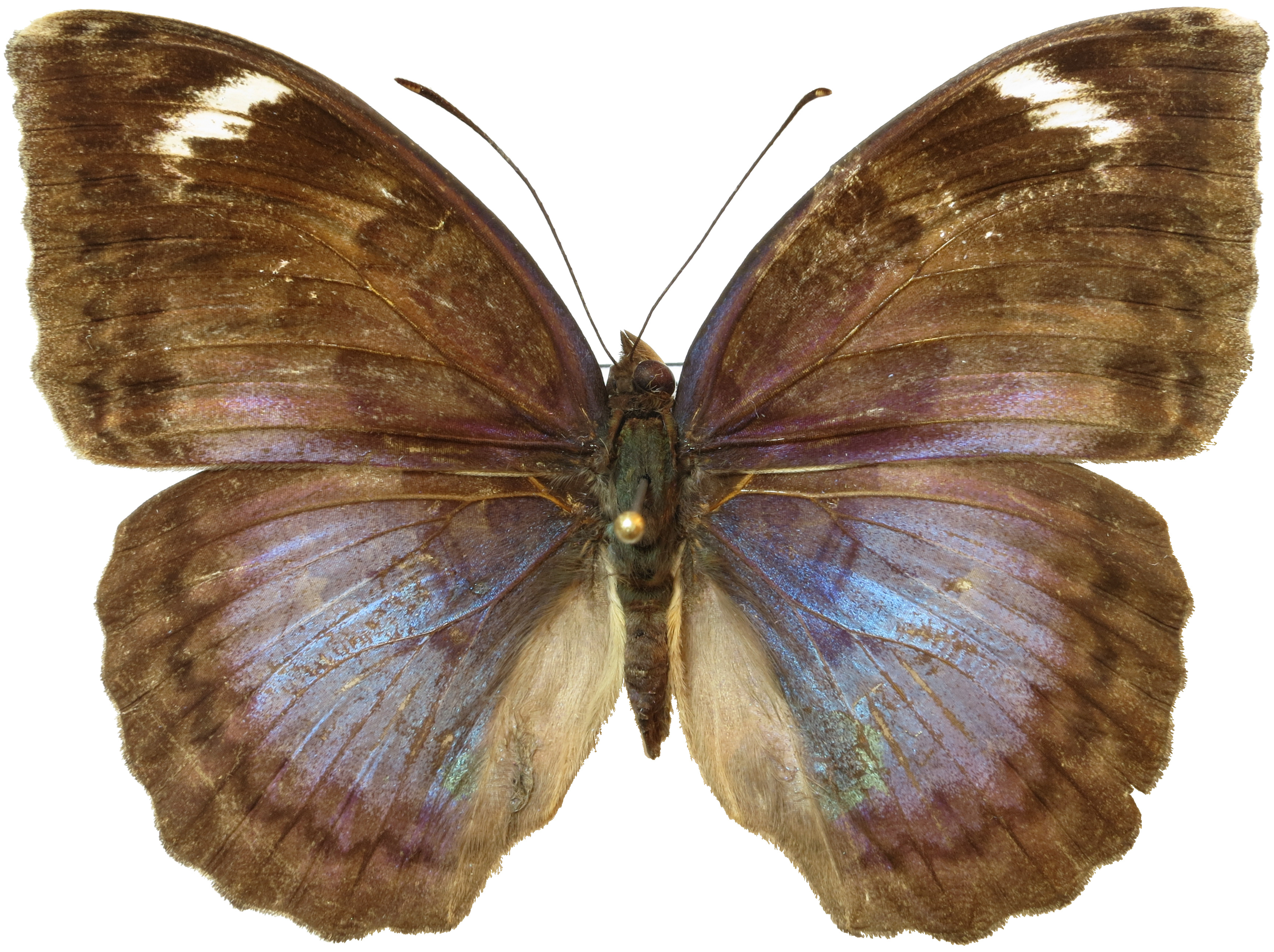
- Female (specimen, dorsal side)
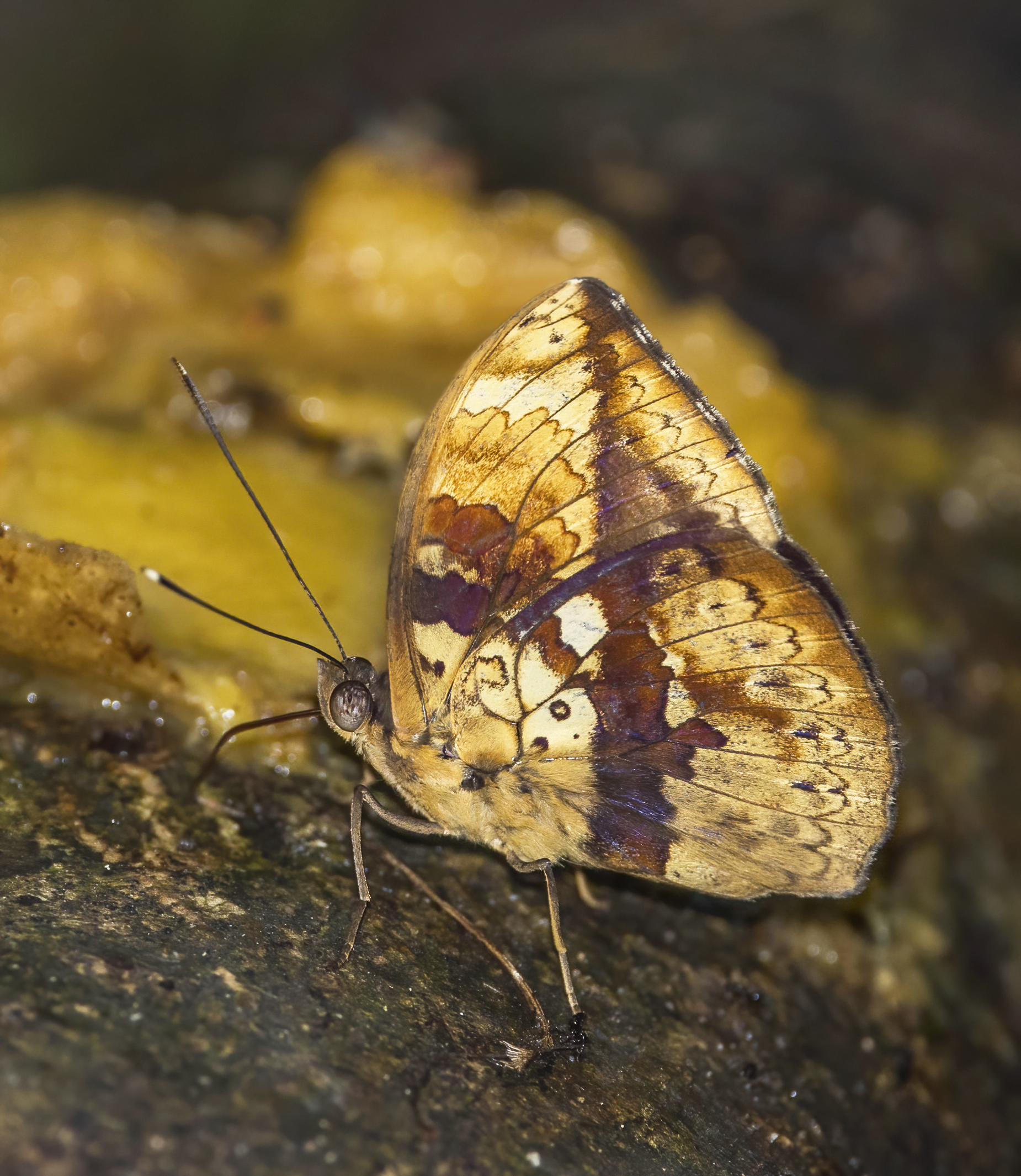
- Male (underside) from Ghana

Scientific classification
- Kingdom: Animalia
- Phylum: Arthropoda
- Clade: Pancrustacea
- Class: Insecta
- Order: Lepidoptera
- Family: Nymphalidae
- Genus: Bebearia
- Species: B. barce

Binomial name
- Bebearia barce (Doubleday, 1847)

Synonyms
- Aterica barce Doubleday, 1847; Bebearia (Apectinaria) barce; Euryphene lesbonax Hewitson, 1864; Euryphene barce ab. achillaena Bartel, 1905; Euryphene barce race maculata Aurivillius, 1912

= Bebearia barce =

Shining green forester

Species of butterfly

Bebearia barce, the shining green forester, is a butterfly in the family Nymphalidae. It is found in Guinea, Sierra Leone, Liberia, Ivory Coast, Ghana, Nigeria, Cameroon, Equatorial Guinea, the Republic of the Congo, the Democratic Republic of the Congo and Uganda. The habitat consists of forests.

E. barce Dbl. The under surface is light yellow, in places somewhat suffused with grey, and has rust-brown markings; from the apex of the forewing to the middle of the inner margin of the hindwing runs a broad rust-brown median band, gradually widened posteriorly, which is sharply, but on the hindwing somewhat irregularly defined; in the middle and at the apex of the cell of the forewing there are two broad rust-brown transverse bands, surrounded with lighter brown; a transverse streak in cellule 7 and three rings in the cell of the hindwing are also brown; the submarginal line is fine, blackish, and dentate in each cellule in the shape of a W. In the male the greater part of the hindwing and the basal half of the forewing are bright blue-green above; the apical half of the forewing is black with narrow green subapical band; on the hindwing cellules 1 a and I b are black and there is a black marginal band, narrow in cellules 1c—4, then rapidly widened. Female ab. achillaena Bartel (40 b). The hindwing is light violet-blue above to beyond the middle and the forewing in cellules 1a —3; the subapical band of the forewing is white, but very narrow, only 1mm. in breadth; two transverse streaks at the apex of the cell of the forewing and the proximal part of the distal half of the hindwing are sometimes yellowish. Togo. — maculata Auriv. (40a; as barce) is a local race inhabiting the Cameroons and French Congo, and differs from the typical form in having the subapical band of the forewing in the male broader and light yellow or whitish and in the female 5 mm. in breadth and nearly white; the female has on the upperside of the hindwing a black marginal band with an almost uniform breadth of 6—7 mm., but otherwise nearly agrees with the male thus differing greatly from achillaena.

Adults are attracted to fallen fruit.

The larvae feed on Hypselodelphys species

== Subspecies ==
- Bebearia barce barce — Guinea, Sierra Leone, Liberia, Ivory Coast, Ghana
- Bebearia barce maculata (Aurivillius, 1912) — Nigeria, Cameroon, Bioko, Congo, Uganda: Toro, Democratic Republic of the Congo: Ubangi, Mongala, Uele, north Kivu, Tshopo, Tshuapa, Equateur, Kasai, Sankuru and Lualaba

Torben Larsen developed a species numbering system for his 2005 publication Butterflies of West Africa. The nominate subspecies is #1006. The 'Larsen' numbers have since been used with permission in A Sharp Eye on Butterflies of Ghana.
