= Hylaeanthe =

Scientific classification
- Kingdom: Plantae
- Clade: Tracheophytes
- Clade: Angiosperms
- Clade: Monocots
- Clade: Commelinids
- Order: Zingiberales
- Family: Marantaceae
- Genus: Hylaeanthe; A.M.E.Jonker & Jonker

Genus of flowering plants

Hylaeanthe is a genus of flowering plants in the family Marantaceae. It is native to Central and South America.

== Species ==
The genus contains 5 recognized species:

- Hylaeanthe hexantha (Poepp. & Endl.) A.M.E.Jonker & Jonker, Acta Bot. Neerl. 4: 175 (1955). - Brazil, Peru, Ecuador, Suriname, French Guiana)
- Hylaeanthe hoffmannii (K.Schum.) A.M.E.Jonker & Jonker ex H.Kenn., Monogr. Syst. Bot. Missouri Bot. Gard. 92: 656 (2003). - Costa Rica, Nicaragua
- Hylaeanthe panamensis (Standl.) H.Kenn., Ann. Missouri Bot. Gard. 60: 426 (1973). - Colombia, Panamá
- Hylaeanthe polystachya (Pulle) A.M.E.Jonker & Jonker, Acta Bot. Neerl. 4: 175 (1955). - Suriname
- Hylaeanthe unilateralis (Poepp. & Endl.) A.M.E.Jonker & Jonker, Acta Bot. Neerl. 4: 175 (1955). - Brazil, Paraguay, Peru, Ecuador, Bolilvia, Venezuela, Suriname, French Guiana
