= Myanmaranthus =

Scientific classification
- Kingdom: Plantae
- Clade: Tracheophytes
- Clade: Angiosperms
- Clade: Monocots
- Clade: Commelinids
- Order: Zingiberales
- Family: Marantaceae
- Genus: Myanmaranthus; Nob.Tanaka, Suksathan & K.Armstr.
- Species: M. roseiflorus

Binomial name
- Myanmaranthus roseiflorus Nob.Tanaka & K.Armstr.

Genus of flowering plants

Myanmaranthus is a genus of flowering plants in the family Marantaceae. It includes a single species, Myanmaranthus roseiflorus, which endemic to Myanmar and known only from a single location in Kachin State. It is an herbaceous plant up to 2.5 meters tall which grows from a rhizome, with pink flowers.

The plant was collected in the buffer zone of Hkakaborazi National Park, growing in a disturbed roadside area through primary subtropical moist evergreen forest at 568 metres elevation.

The genus and species were described in 2022. Myanmaranthus is most closely related to genus Phrynium, but differs in having a rosulate habit, a loose paniculate inflorescence arising from the rhizome, an absence of interphylls and bracteoles, and fertile bracts that each hold a single pink flower.
