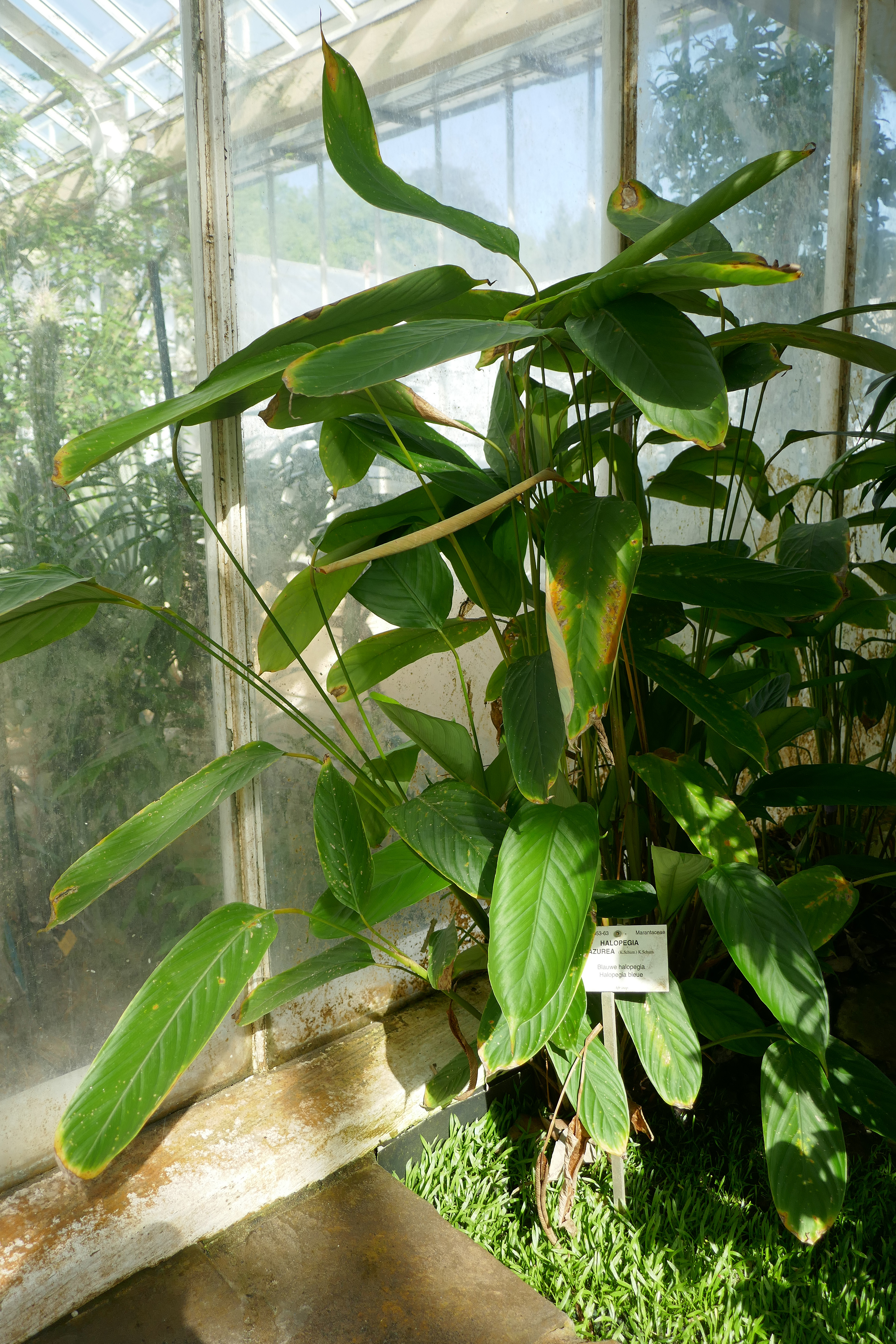
- Halopegia azurea

Scientific classification
- Kingdom: Plantae
- Clade: Tracheophytes
- Clade: Angiosperms
- Clade: Monocots
- Clade: Commelinids
- Order: Zingiberales
- Family: Marantaceae
- Genus: Halopegia; K.Schum.

= Halopegia =

Genus of flowering plants

Halopegia is a genus of plants native to tropical Africa, Madagascar, and tropical southeast Asia (Indochina, Java). Three species are recognized as of April 2014:

- Halopegia azurea (K.Schum.) K.Schum. in H.G.A.Engler (ed.), Das Pflanzenreich, IV, 48: 50 (1902). - Africa
- Halopegia blumei (Körn.) K.Schum. in H.G.A.Engler (ed.), Das Pflanzenreich, IV, 48: 51 (1902). - Java + Indochina
- Halopegia perrieri Guillaumin, Bull. Mus. Natl. Hist. Nat. 32: 403 (1926). - Madagascar
