= Monophyllanthe =

Scientific classification
- Kingdom: Plantae
- Clade: Tracheophytes
- Clade: Angiosperms
- Clade: Monocots
- Clade: Commelinids
- Order: Zingiberales
- Family: Marantaceae
- Genus: Monophyllanthe; K.Schum

Genus of flowering plants

Monophyllanthe is a genus of plants native to Brazil, Colombia, French Guinea and Suriname. It contains 2 recognized species:

- Monophyllanthe araracuarensis S.Suárez, Galeano & H.Kenn. - Brazil and Colombia
- Monophyllanthe oligophylla K.Schum. - French Guiana and Suriname
