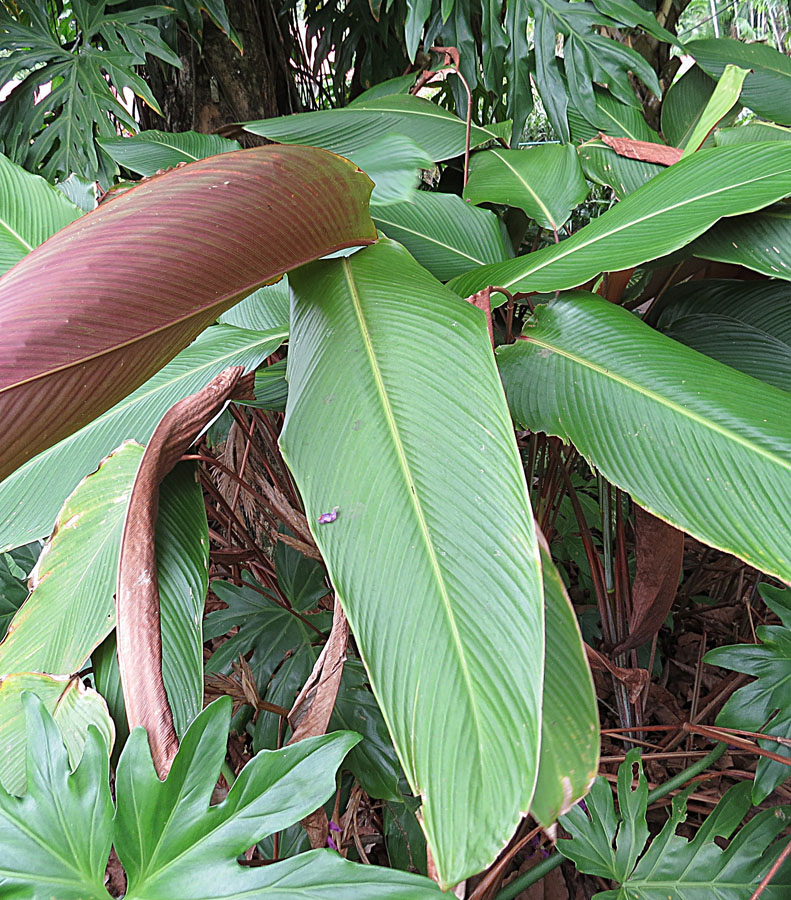
- Pleiostachya pruinosa

Scientific classification
- Kingdom: Plantae
- Clade: Tracheophytes
- Clade: Angiosperms
- Clade: Monocots
- Clade: Commelinids
- Order: Zingiberales
- Family: Marantaceae
- Genus: Pleiostachya; K.Schum

= Pleiostachya =

Genus of flowering plants

Pleiostachya is a genus of plants in the Marantaceae family native to Mexico, Central America, Colombia, and Ecuador. It contains 3 recognized species:

- Pleiostachya leiostachya (Donn.Sm.) Hammel, Phytologia 60: 16 (1986).- Costa Rica, Panamá
- Pleiostachya pittieri Rowlee ex Standl., J. Wash. Acad. Sci. 15: 5 (1925). - Colombia, Panamá
- Pleiostachya pruinosa (Regel) K.Schum. in H.G.A.Engler (ed.), Das Pflanzenreich IV, 48: 165 (1902). - Mexico, Central America, Colombia, Ecuador
