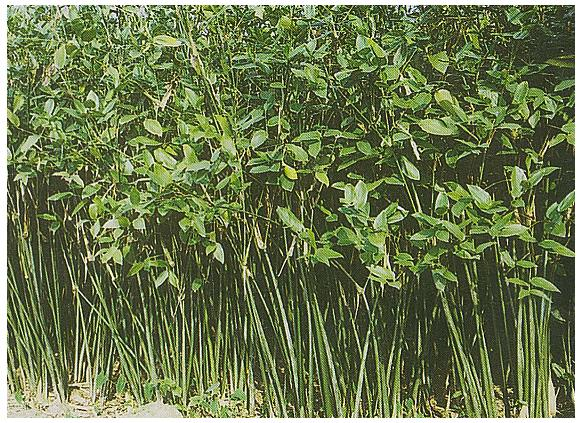

Scientific classification
- Kingdom: Plantae
- Clade: Tracheophytes
- Clade: Angiosperms
- Clade: Monocots
- Clade: Commelinids
- Order: Zingiberales
- Family: Marantaceae
- Genus: Schumannianthus
- Species: S. dichotomus

Binomial name
- Schumannianthus dichotomus (Roxb.) Gagnep.

Synonyms
- Clinogyne dichotoma (Roxb.) Salisb.; Maranta dichotoma (Roxb.) Wall.; Phrynium dichotomum Roxb.; Thalia dealbata Link nom illeg.; Thalia dichotoma (Roxb.) Roxb. ex Link

= Schumannianthus dichotomus =

Species of flowering plant

Schumannianthus dichotomus, also known as cool mat, is a species of flowering plant first described by Roxburgh, with its current name after Gagnepain. The species belongs to the family Marantaceae and no subspecies are listed.

S. dichotomus is typically found in muddy riparian areas; it is known as Pati Doi in Assamese and Murta in Sylheti, Mostak, Pati bet patipata and paitara in Bengali; in Vietnamese it is called lùm nước; in Thai it is called Khla; in Myanmar is called Thin; in Chittagong it is called "Fadirjam (ফাডিরজাম)".

== Description ==
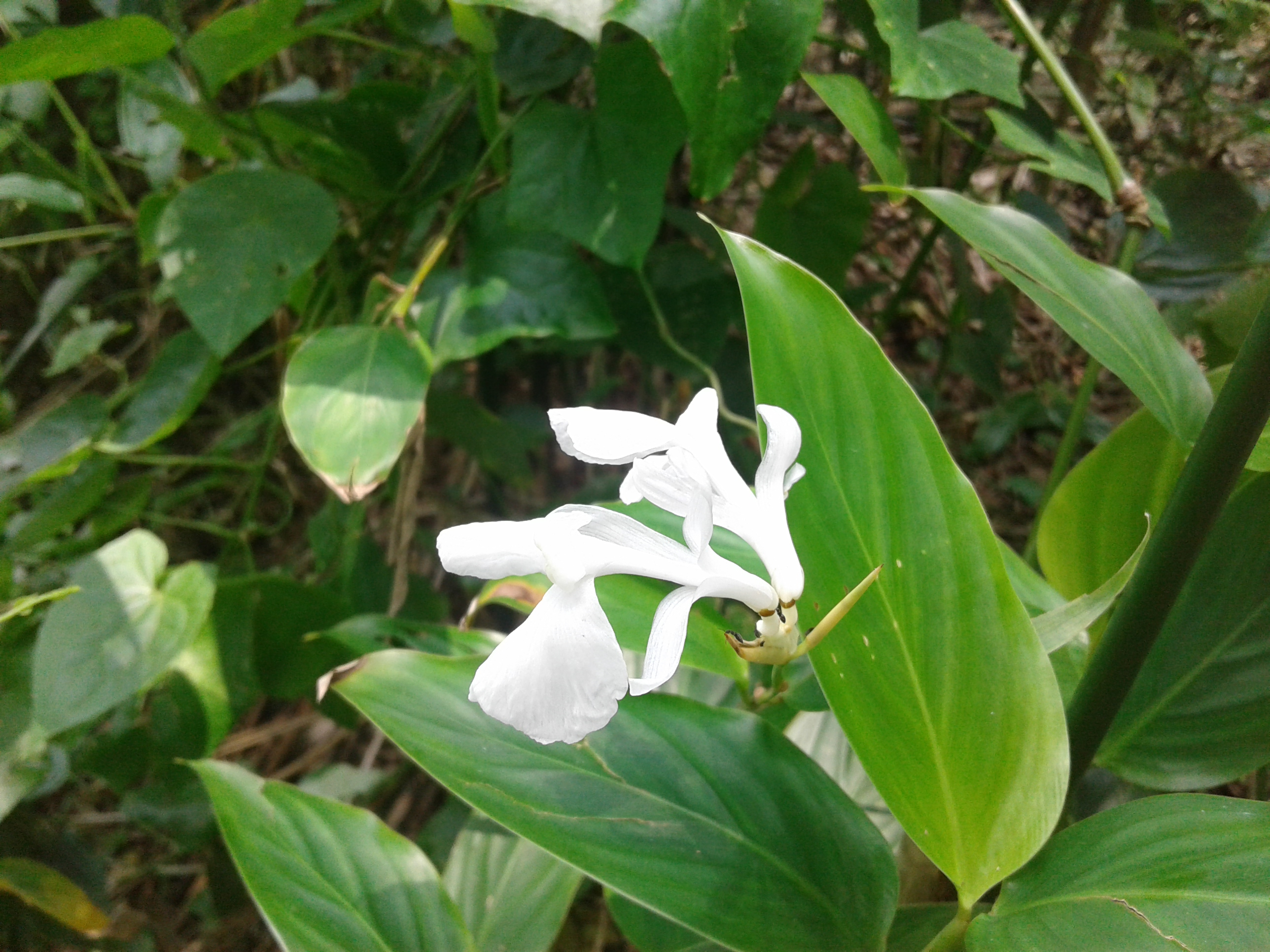
Flower of Schumannianthus dichotomus in bloom in the district of Lakshmipur, Bangladesh

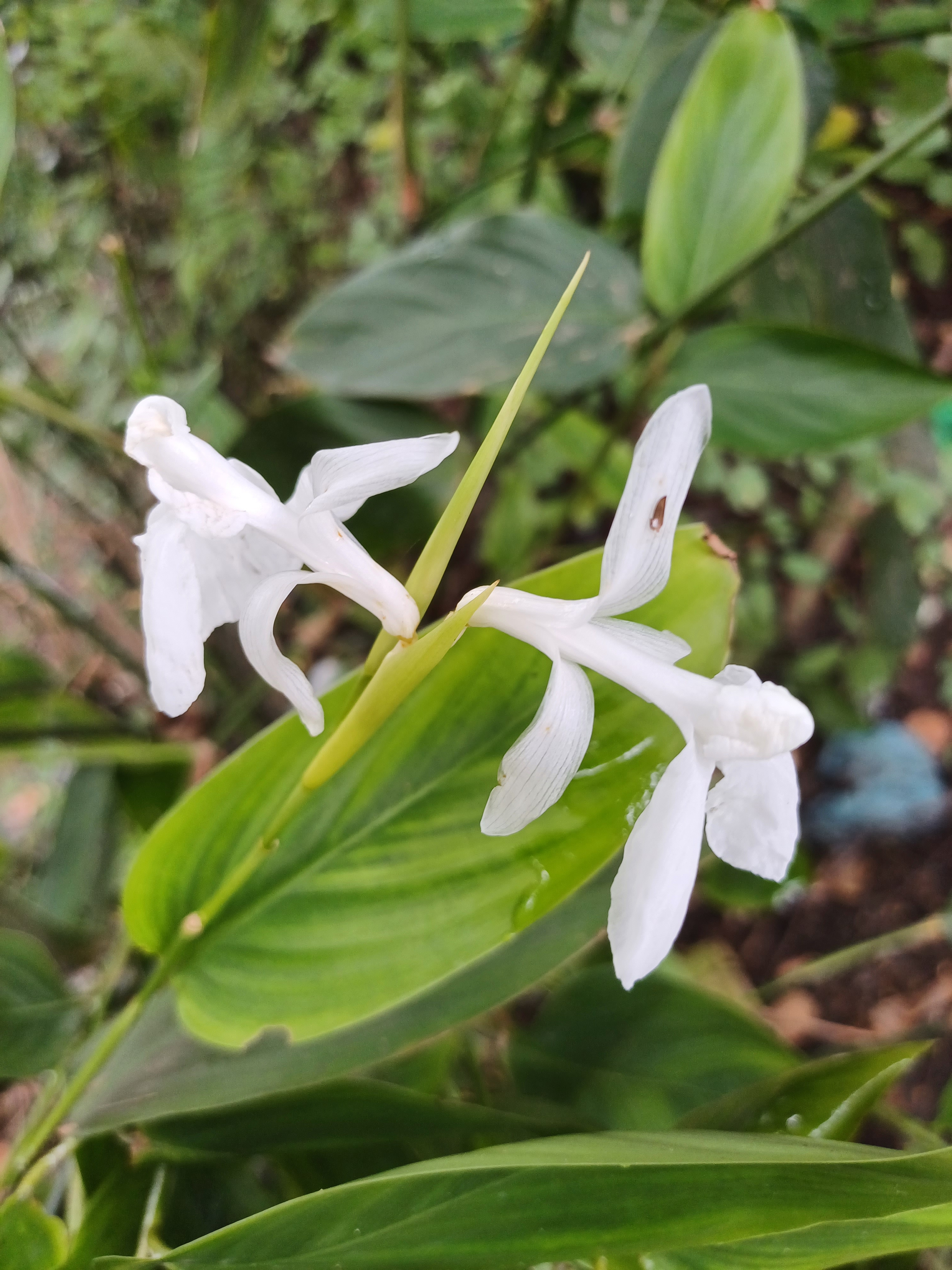
Flower of Schumannianthus dichotomus Satkania Upazila of Chittagong District, Bangladesh

It is a rhizomatous plant with an erect and glossy green stem attaining a height of 3–5 m and a diameter of up to 20 mm. The stems are leafy and dichotomously branched.

== Distribution ==
Geographically it is distributed in northeast Bangladesh, West Bengal, Assam, Burma, Thailand, Cambodia, Vietnam, Peninsular Malaysia, Borneo and the Philippines. In Bangladesh, it is found in Comilla, Tangail and in the swamp forests of Sylhet; in India, it is found in the Majuli island of Assam. It is cultivated mostly in the districts of Sylhet, Sunamganj, Barisal, Tangail, Comilla, Noakhali, Feni and Chittagong.

== Uses ==
The plant used for making the Shital pati a traditional bed mat in Bangladesh and East India. Traditional artisans make strips from the outer portion of the stem including the epidermal part. These split strips are processed and plaited into mats. Murta splits are also used for making prayer mats, baskets, bags, novelty items, etc. The strips from the pith portion are used as binding materials.

Forestry Master Plan (1982) of Bangladesh estimates that about 8,000 people are employed in sitalpati making in the country. Swampy and marshy lands are suitable for murta cultivation. Traditionally it is propagated through rhizomes, but can be also propagated through branch cuttings. The propagules are planted during the months of May–June. After planting it takes 2–3 years to reach the harvestable size. February–March is the harvesting period. It can also be propagated through seeds. It grows well in partial shade. So, farmers often plant Erythrina trees in murta fields. It needs no special management other than weeding.

In the traditional production of Tungrymbai, an Indian fermented soybean food, the leaves are packed together with boiled soybeans.
