= Koernickanthe =

Scientific classification
- Kingdom: Plantae
- Clade: Tracheophytes
- Clade: Angiosperms
- Clade: Monocots
- Clade: Commelinids
- Order: Zingiberales
- Family: Marantaceae
- Genus: Koernickanthe; L.Andersson
- Species: K. orbiculata

Binomial name
- Koernickanthe orbiculata (Körn.) L.Andersson

Genus of flowering plants

Koernickanthe is a monotypic genus of flowering plants. It contains only one recognized species, Koernickanthe orbiculata (Körn.) L.Andersson, native to Brazil, Bolivia and Suriname.
