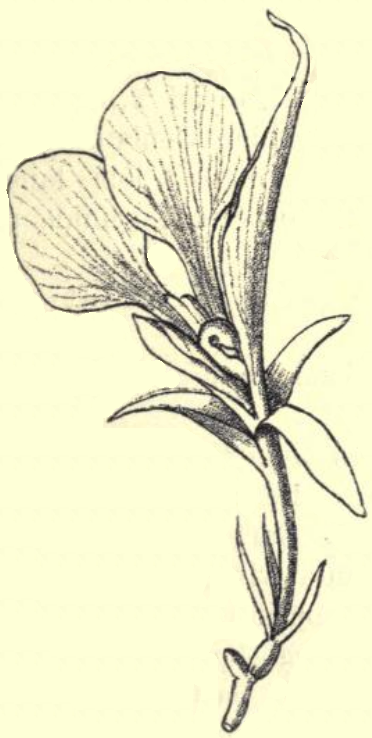
- Botanical illustration of the flower, accompanying the protologue.

Scientific classification
- Kingdom: Plantae
- Clade: Tracheophytes
- Clade: Angiosperms
- Clade: Monocots
- Clade: Commelinids
- Order: Zingiberales
- Family: Marantaceae
- Genus: Afrocalathea; K.Schum.
- Species: A. rhizantha

Binomial name
- Afrocalathea rhizantha (K.Schum) K.Schum

Synonyms
- Calathea rhizantha K.Schum

= Afrocalathea =

Genus of flowering plants

Afrocalathea is a genus of plants native to Africa. It contains only one species: Afrocalathea rhizantha (K.Schum.) K.Schum, known from Nigeria, Cameroon, Gabon, Cabinda, and Congo-Brazzaville.
