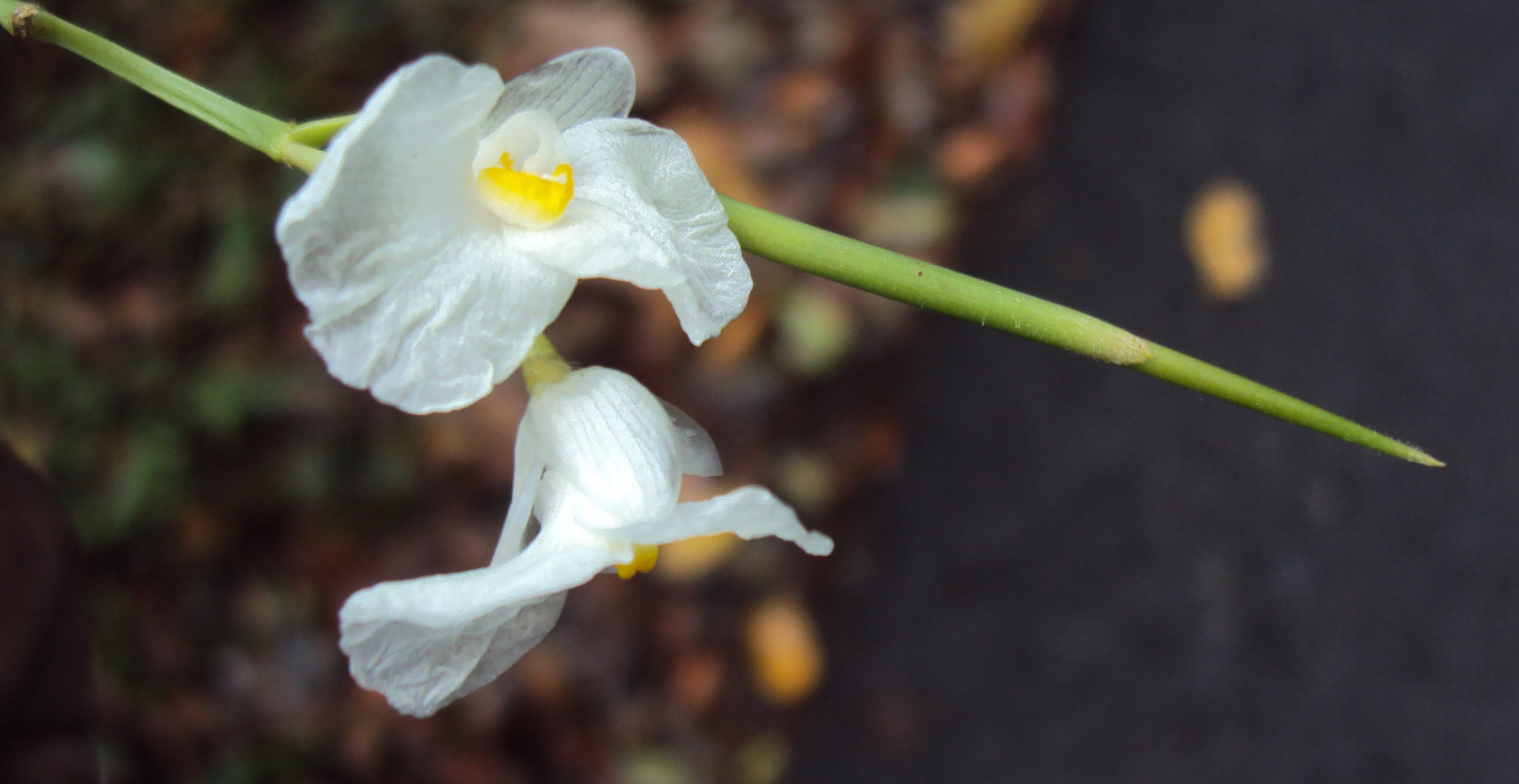

Scientific classification
- Kingdom: Plantae
- Clade: Embryophytes
- Clade: Tracheophytes
- Clade: Spermatophytes
- Clade: Angiosperms
- Clade: Monocots
- Clade: Commelinids
- Order: Zingiberales
- Family: Marantaceae
- Genus: Indianthus; Suksathan & Borchs
- Species: I. virgatus

Binomial name
- Indianthus virgatus (Roxb.) Suksathan & Borchs.

Synonyms
- Arundastrum virgatum (Roxb.) Kuntze; Clinogyne virgata (Roxb.) Benth. & Hook.f.; Donax virgata (Roxb.) K.Schum.; Maranta virgata (Roxb.) A.Dietr.; Phrynium virgatum Roxb. (1810) (basionym); Phyllodes virgata (Roxb.) Kuntze; Schumannianthus virgatus (Roxb.) Rolfe

= Indianthus =

Genus of flowering plants

Indianthus is a genus of plants. It contains only one species, Indianthus virgatus (Roxb.) Suksathan & Borchs, native to India, Sri Lanka and the Andaman Islands.
