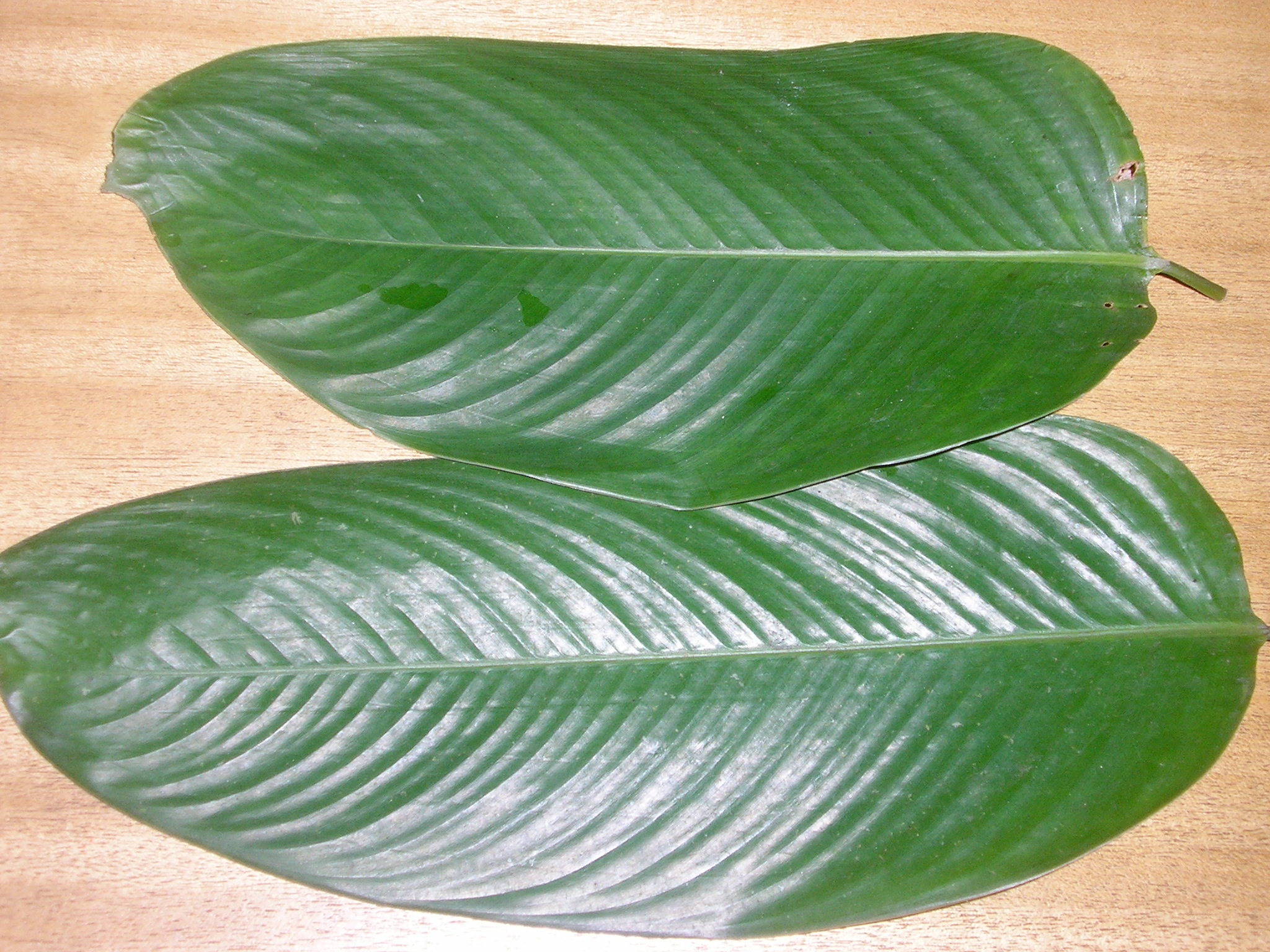
- "Ewe eran" leaves (Thaumatococcus daniellii)

Scientific classification
- Kingdom: Plantae
- Clade: Tracheophytes
- Clade: Angiosperms
- Clade: Monocots
- Clade: Commelinids
- Order: Zingiberales
- Family: Marantaceae
- Genus: Thaumatococcus; Benth.

Species
- Thaumatococcus daniellii (Benn.) Benth.; Thaumatococcus flavus A.C.Ley

= Thaumatococcus =

Genus of flowering plants

Thaumatococcus is a genus of tropical flowering plants in the arrowroot family, Marantaceae, thought for many years to contain a single species from western Africa: Thaumatococcus daniellii. A second species, however, was described in 2012: Thaumatococcus flavus, native to Gabon in central Africa.
