= Myrosma =

Scientific classification
- Kingdom: Plantae
- Clade: Tracheophytes
- Clade: Angiosperms
- Clade: Monocots
- Clade: Commelinids
- Order: Zingiberales
- Family: Marantaceae
- Genus: Myrosma; L.f.
- Species: M. cannifolia

Binomial name
- Myrosma cannifolia L.f.

Synonyms
- List: Thalianthus Klotzsch ex Körn.; Phrynium myrosma Roscoe; Maranta myrosma A.Dietr.; Calathea myrosma Körn.; Phyllodes myrosma Kuntze; Myrosma canniformis Willd.; Maranta cuyabensis Körn; Thalianthus macropus Klotzsch ex Körn Maranta moritziana; Körn. Saranthe cuyabensis; (Körn.) Eichler Saranthe moritziana; (Körn.) Eichler Thalia coarctata; Petersen Myrosma cuyabensis; (Körn.) K.Schum. Myrosma boliviana; Loes. Saranthe marcgravii; Pickel

Genus of flowering plants

Myrosma is a genus of plants. Only one species is currently recognized: Myrosma cannifolia, the cannaleaf myrosma, native to northern South America (Brazil, Peru, Bolivia, Suriname, French Guiana, Guyana) as well as Trinidad and the Windward Islands. It is considered naturalized in Haiti, Puerto Rico and the Leeward Islands.
