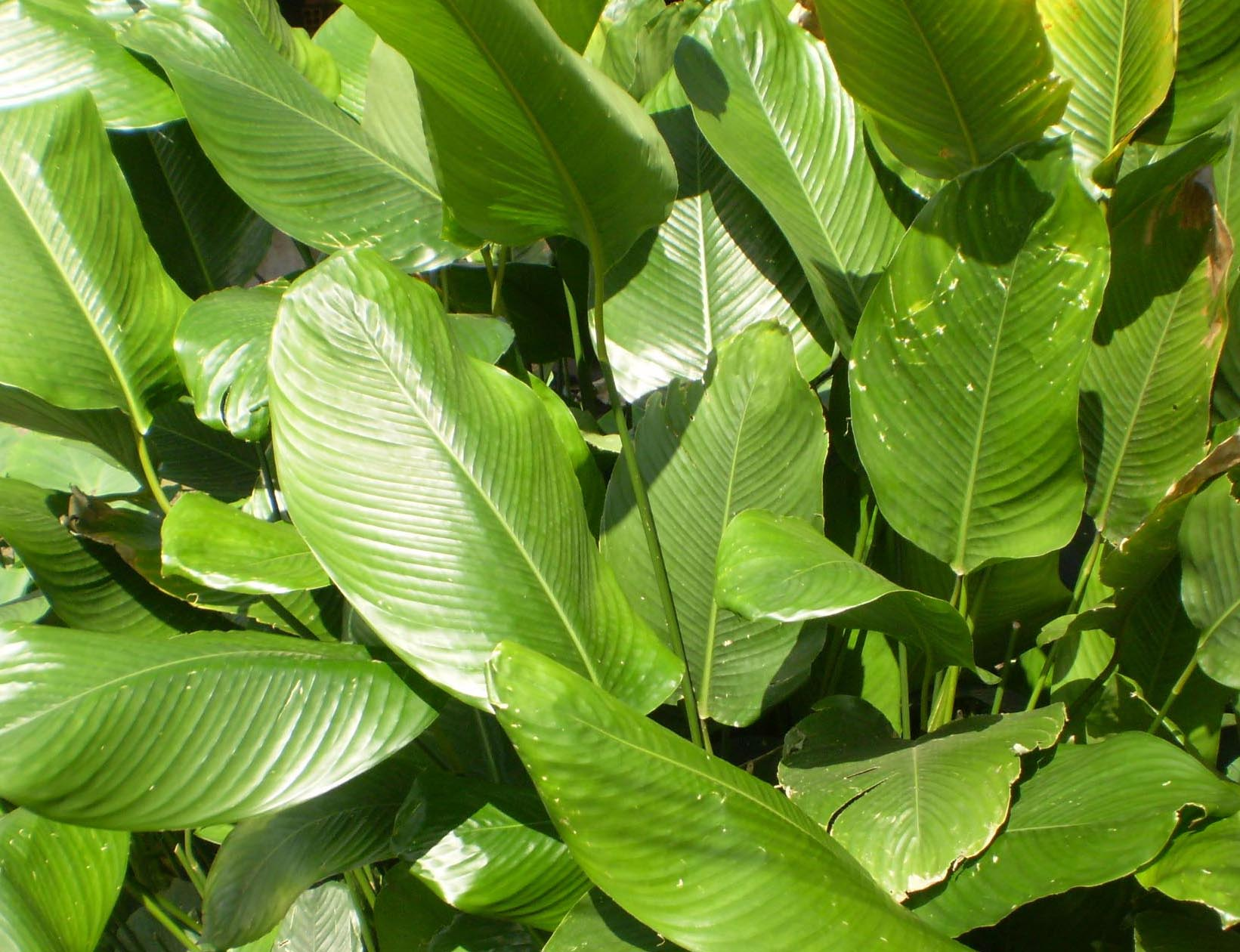
- Stachyphrynium placentarium leaves, Vietnam

Scientific classification
- Kingdom: Plantae
- Clade: Tracheophytes
- Clade: Angiosperms
- Clade: Monocots
- Clade: Commelinids
- Order: Zingiberales
- Family: Marantaceae
- Genus: Stachyphrynium; K.Schum. 1902, conserved name

Type species
- Stachyphrynium latifolium (Blume) K.Schum.

Synonyms
- Phyllodes Lour. 1790, rejected name

= Stachyphrynium =

Genus of plants

Stachyphrynium is a genus of plants native to China, the Indian subcontinent, and Southeast Asia. It was first described as a genus with this name in 1902.

== Species ==
The Kew World Checklist includes:

- Stachyphrynium borneense - Borneo
- Stachyphrynium calcicola - Borneo
- Stachyphrynium lancifolium - Borneo
- Stachyphrynium latifolium - S Thailand, P Malaysia, Borneo, Java, Sumatra, Sulawesi
- Stachyphrynium longispicatum - S Thailand, P Malaysia
- Stachyphrynium placentarium - synonym: Phrynium placentarium (Lour.) Merr. - China (Guangdong, Guangxi, Guizhou, Hainan, Tibet, Yunnan) Bhutan, India, Indonesia, Myanmar, Philippines, Thailand, Vietnam
- Stachyphrynium repens - Java, Sumatra, Sulawesi, P Malaysia, Indochina, Andaman Islands
- Stachyphrynium spicatum - Yunnan, India, Sri Lanka, Andaman Island, Myanmar, Thailand, Laos
