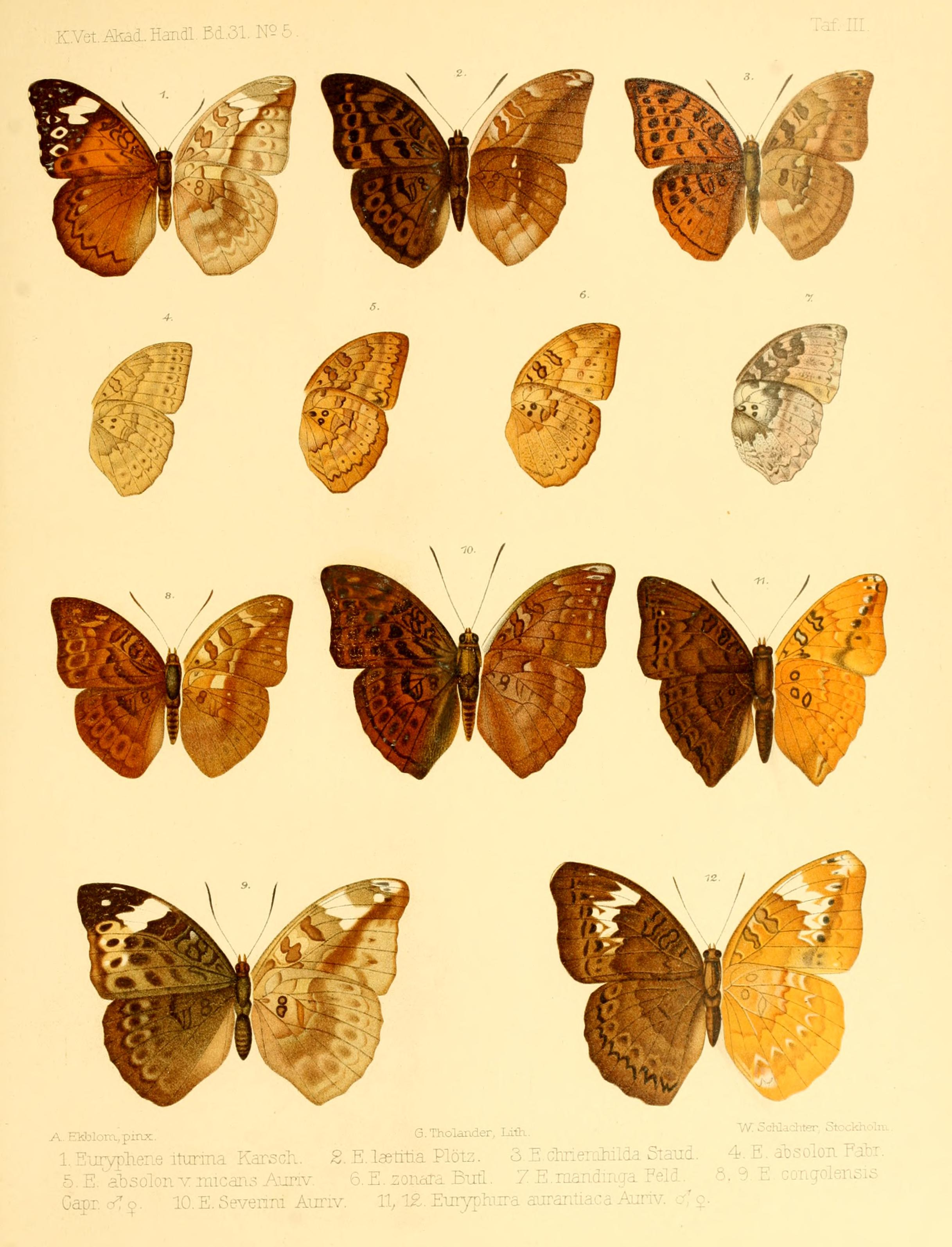
- in Rhopalocera Aethiopica Aurivillius, 1869

Scientific classification
- Kingdom: Animalia
- Phylum: Arthropoda
- Clade: Pancrustacea
- Class: Insecta
- Order: Lepidoptera
- Family: Nymphalidae
- Genus: Bebearia
- Species: B. zonara

Binomial name
- Bebearia zonara (Butler, 1871)

Synonyms
- Aterica zonara Butler, 1871; Bebearia (Apectinaria) zonara

= Bebearia zonara =

- male, Kakum national Park, Ghana

Species of butterfly

Bebearia zonara, the light brown forester, is a butterfly in the family Nymphalidae. It is found in Sierra Leone, Liberia, Ivory Coast, Ghana, Nigeria, Cameroon, Bioko, Gabon, the Republic of the Congo, the Central African Republic, the Democratic Republic of the Congo (Mayumbe, Ubangi, Mongala, Uele, Ituri, Tshopo, Equateur, Cataractes, Kasai, Sankuru and Lualaba) and Uganda (Semuliki National Park and Semliki-Toro Reserve). The habitat consists of forests.

E. zonara Btlr. (41 d). In the male the wings are orange or light brown-yellow above and the black transverse bands narrow and almost completely broken up into small, well separated spots; hence the light ground-colour occupies much more space than in the other species; the under surface is grey-yellowish and only differs from that of absolon in having the apex of the forewing divided by a not sharply defined oblique band running in the direction of the middle of the hindmargin. The female agrees with the allied species above and only differs beneath from that of absolon in the dark oblique band at the apex of the forewing. Gold Coast to the interior of the Congo region.

The larvae feed on Hypselodelphys species.

Torben Larsen developed a species numbering system for his 2005 publication Butterflies of West Africa. This species is #1001. The 'Larsen' numbers have since been used with permission in A Sharp Eye on Butterflies of Ghana.
