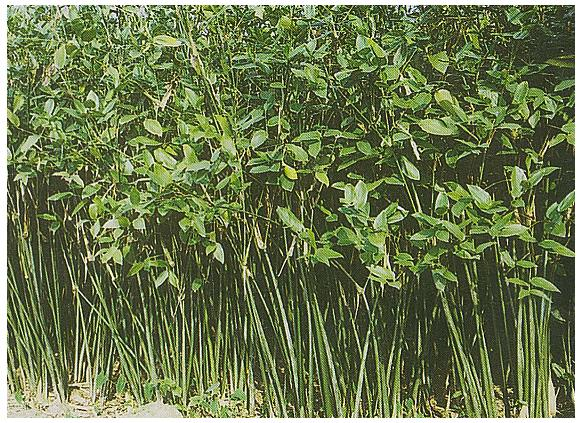

Scientific classification
- Kingdom: Plantae
- Clade: Embryophytes
- Clade: Tracheophytes
- Clade: Spermatophytes
- Clade: Angiosperms
- Clade: Monocots
- Clade: Commelinids
- Order: Zingiberales
- Family: Marantaceae
- Genus: Schumannianthus; Gagnep.

= Schumannianthus =

Genus of plants

Schumannianthus is a genus of flowering plants in the family Marantaceae described in 1904.

Schumannianthus dichotomus is cultivated in riverine areas of South Asia and Southeast Asia for making Shital pati, a type of mat that feel cool to the touch, for use on floors and beds.

Species

- Schumannianthus dichotomus (Roxb.) Gagnep. - E Himalayas, Indochina, P Malaysia, Borneo, Philippines
- Schumannianthus monophyllus Suksathan, Borchs. & A.D.Poulsen - Sarawak
