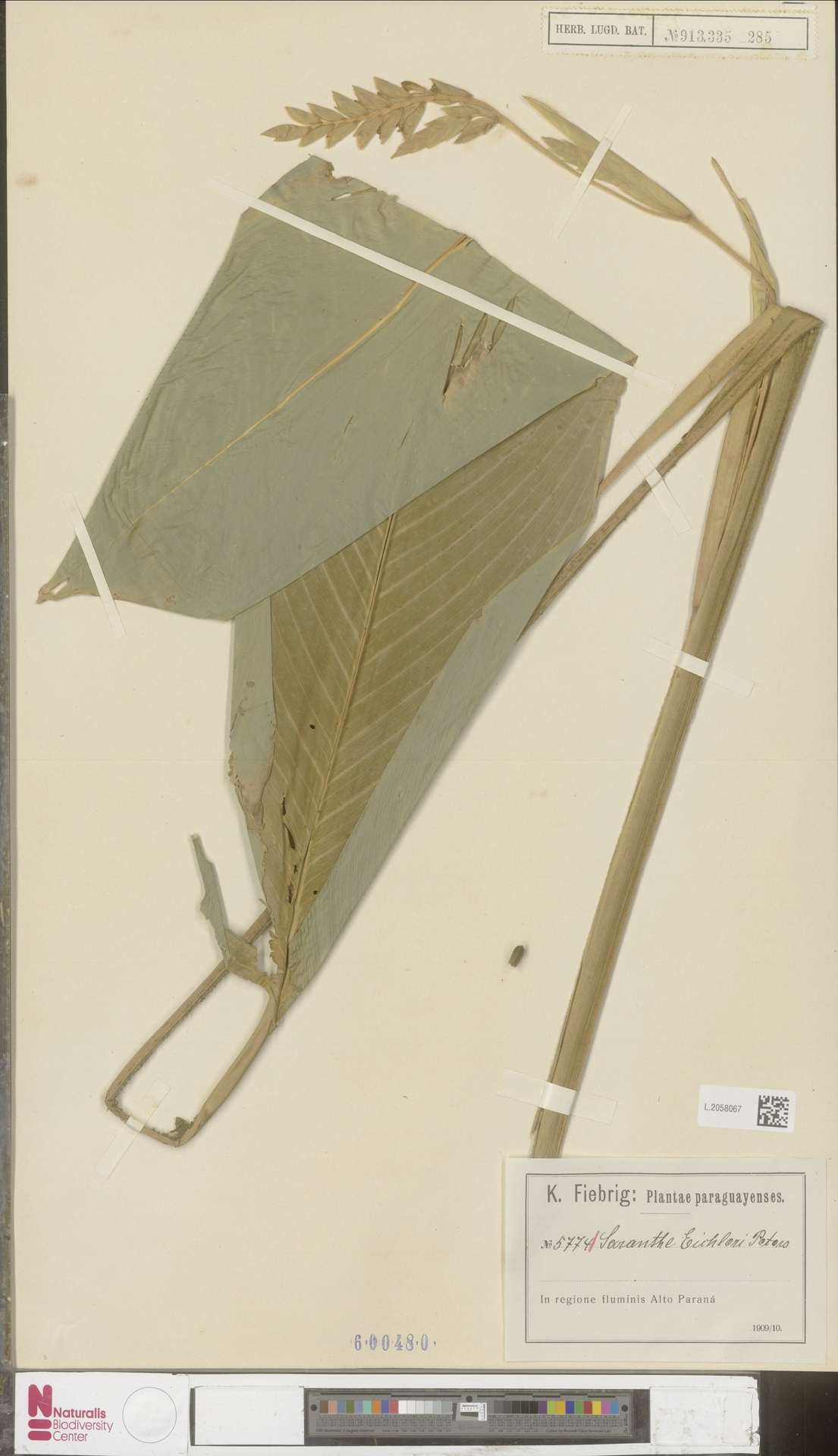

Scientific classification
- Kingdom: Plantae
- Clade: Tracheophytes
- Clade: Angiosperms
- Clade: Monocots
- Clade: Commelinids
- Order: Zingiberales
- Family: Marantaceae
- Genus: Saranthe (Regel & Körn.) Eichler

Synonyms
- Ctenophrynium K.Schum

= Saranthe =

Genus of flowering plants

Saranthe is a genus of plants native to Brazil and Paraguay, described as a genus in 1861.

Species

- Saranthe composita - Espírito Santo, Rio de Janeiro
- Saranthe eichleri - Paraguay, Paraná, São Paulo
- Saranthe gladioli - Rio de Janeiro
- Saranthe glumacea - Rio de Janeiro
- Saranthe klotzschiana - Rio de Janeiro, Bahia
- Saranthe leptostachya - Rio de Janeiro, Espírito Santo
- Saranthe madagascariensis - Rio de Janeiro, Bahia
- Saranthe membranacea - Minas Gerais
- Saranthe tenuifolia - Rio de Janeiro
- Saranthe ustulata - Santa Catarina
