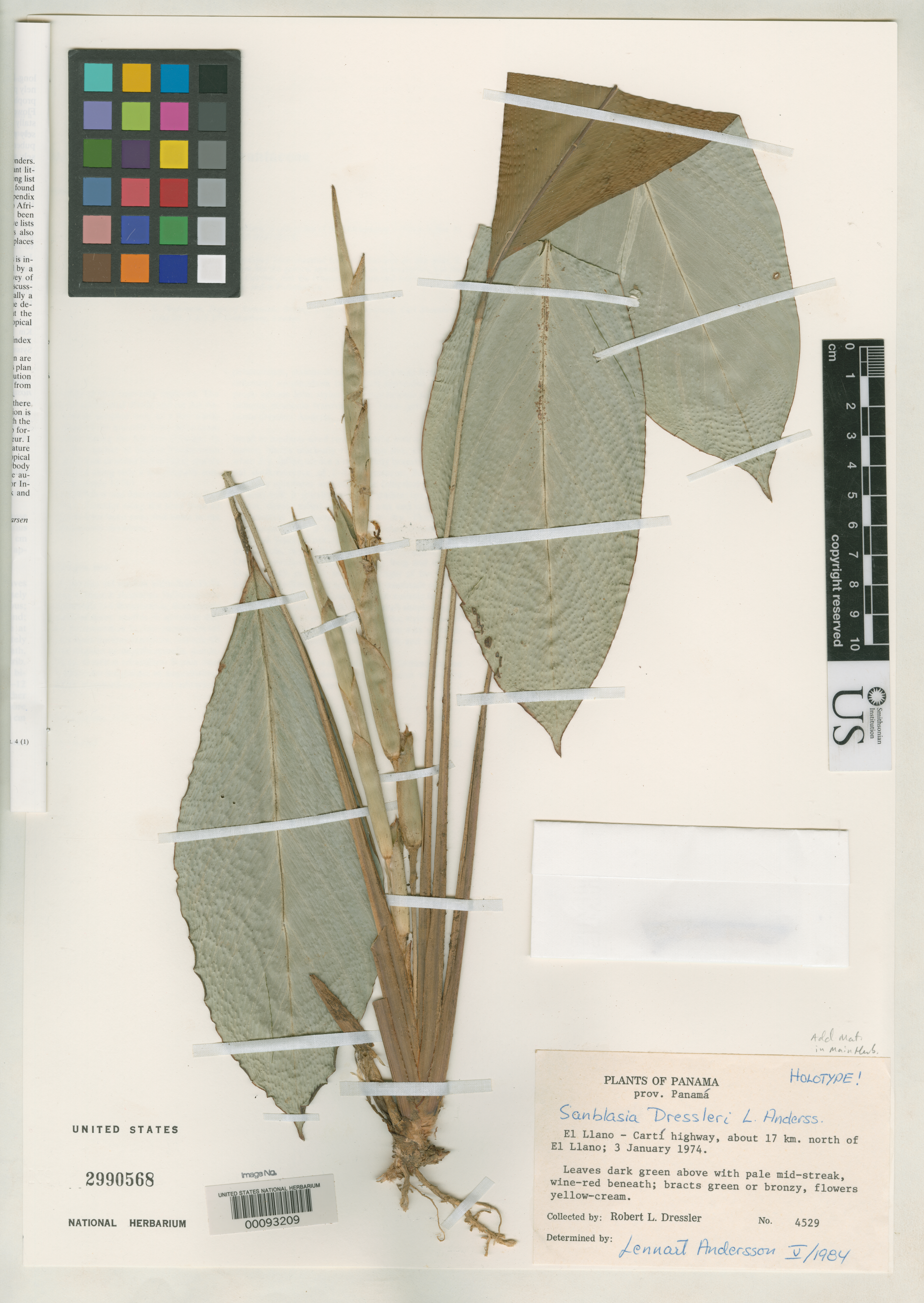

Scientific classification
- Kingdom: Plantae
- Clade: Tracheophytes
- Clade: Angiosperms
- Clade: Monocots
- Clade: Commelinids
- Order: Zingiberales
- Family: Marantaceae
- Genus: Sanblasia; L.Andersson
- Species: S. dressleri

Binomial name
- Sanblasia dressleri L.Andersson

= Sanblasia =

Genus of plants

Sanblasia is a monotypic genus of plants. At present, the only species recognized is Sanblasia dressleri L.Andersson, endemic to Panama.
