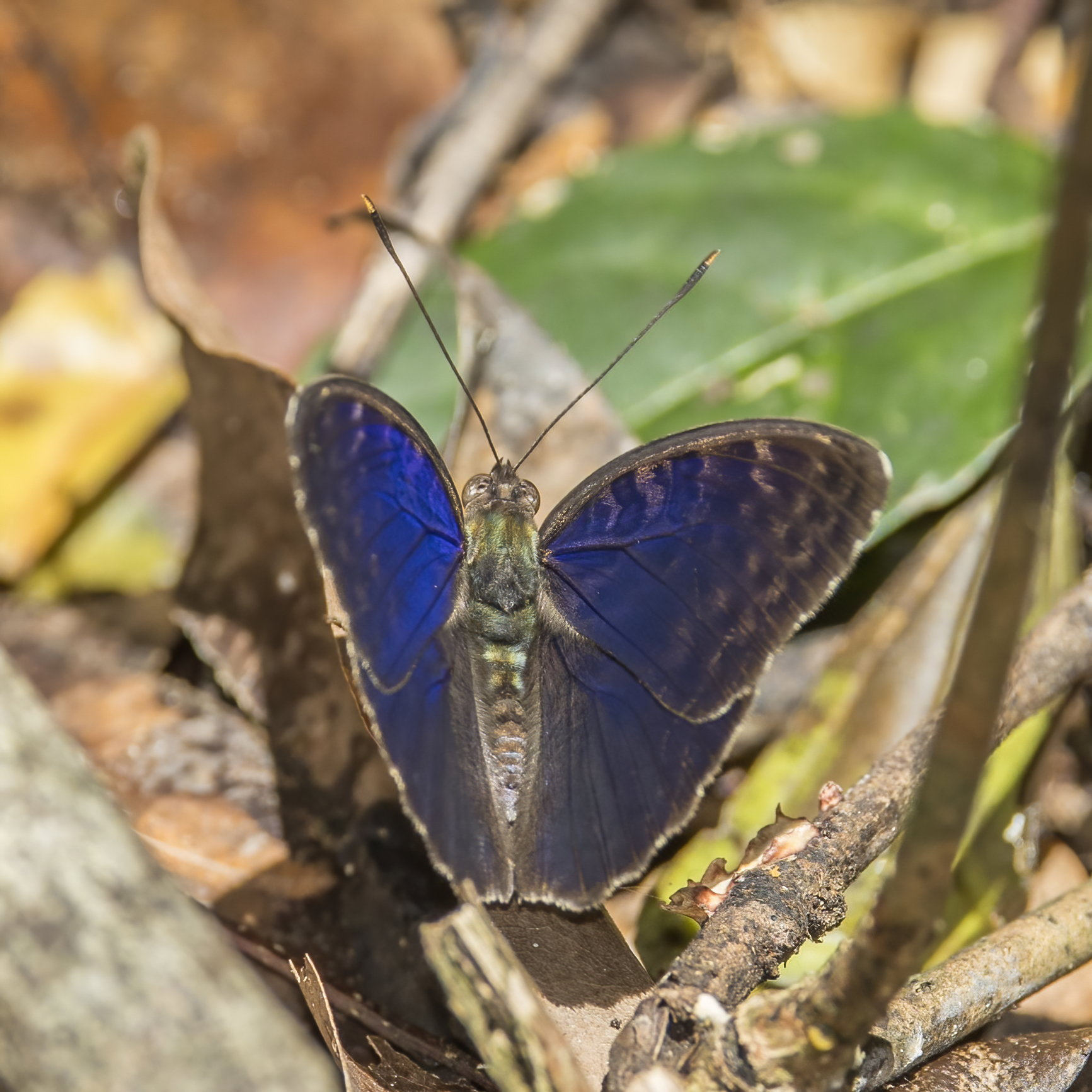
- Male, Ghana

Scientific classification
- Kingdom: Animalia
- Phylum: Arthropoda
- Clade: Pancrustacea
- Class: Insecta
- Order: Lepidoptera
- Family: Nymphalidae
- Genus: Bebearia
- Species: B. carshena

Binomial name
- Bebearia carshena (Hewitson, 1871)

Synonyms
- Euryphene carshena Hewitson, 1871; Bebearia (Apectinaria) carshena

= Bebearia carshena =

Species of butterfly

Bebearia carshena, the shining blue forester, is a butterfly in the family Nymphalidae. It is found in Sierra Leone, Liberia, Ivory Coast, Ghana, Nigeria, Cameroon, Gabon, the Republic of the Congo, the Central African Republic, the Democratic Republic of the Congo (Ubangi, Uele, north Kivu, Tshopo, Equateur and Lualaba), western Uganda and north-western Tanzania. The habitat consists of dense forests.

The males of this species differs from the others at once in having the wings blackish above and the dark transverse bands consequently indistinct or absent; on the forewing distinct black streaks or spots are present only in the cell, at the middle of the costal margin and near the base of cellules 2 and 3; on the hindwing there is a large black spot just beyond the apex of the cell in cellules 4—6; the forewing, however, is bright greenish blue from the base to beyond the middle and the hindwing in the cell and in cellules lc—4; the blue colour is rather sharply separated from the ground-colour; the under surface is rather light yellow with dull brown or dark markings, of which only a dot and two spots in the cell of the forewing, a dot and two rings in the cell and a larger spot near the base of cellules 5 and 6 of the hindwing stand out sharply; the blackish submarginal dots are also quite distinct. The females of this are distinguished by the absence in cellules la and lb of the dark spots of the third transverse band on the upperside of the forewing, so that the light yellow ground-colour forms a large spot in the middle of the hindmargin; the median band of the hindwing is only inconsiderably widened towards the costal margin, in cellule 5 scarcely more than 5 mm. in breadth and in cellule 6 clothed with dark scales; the under surface has the same markings as in the male but is lighter; the spot in cellules 5 and 6 of the hindwing is large, quadrate and very distinct. Gold Coast to the Congo and Albert Nyanza.

The larvae feed on Marantochloa species.

Torben Larsen developed a species numbering system for his 2005 publication Butterflies of West Africa. This species is #998. The 'Larsen' numbers have since been used with permission in A Sharp Eye on Butterflies of Ghana.
