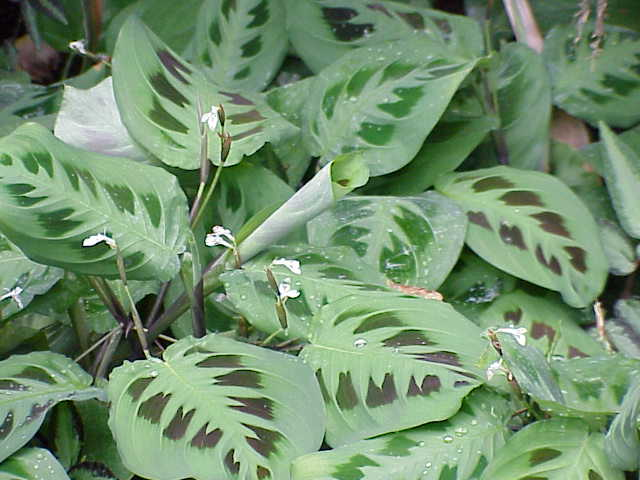
- Maranta leuconeura

Scientific classification
- Kingdom: Plantae
- Clade: Embryophytes
- Clade: Tracheophytes
- Clade: Spermatophytes
- Clade: Angiosperms
- Clade: Monocots
- Clade: Commelinids
- Order: Zingiberales
- Family: Marantaceae; R.Br.

Type genus
- Maranta L.

Genera
- See text

= Marantaceae =

Family of flowering plants in the Commelinid order Zingiberales

The Marantaceae are a family, the arrowroot family, or the prayer plant family, of flowering plants consisting of 28 genera and around 530 species, defining it as one of the most species-rich families in its order. Species of this family are found in lowland tropical forests of Africa, Asia, and the Americas. The majority (80%) of the species are found in the American tropics, followed by Asian (11%) and African (9%) tropics. They are commonly called the prayer-plant family and are also known for their unique secondary pollination presentation.

== Description ==
The plants usually have underground rhizomes or tubers. The leaves are arranged in two rows with the petioles having a sheathing base. The leaf blade is narrow or broad with pinnate veins running parallel to the midrib. The petiole may be winged, and swollen into a pulvinus at the base.

The inflorescence is a spike or panicle, enclosed by spathe-like bracts. The flowers are small and often inconspicuous, irregular, and bisexual, usually with an outer three free sepals and an inner series of three petaloid-like segments, tube-like in appearance. The fruit is either fleshy or a loculicidal capsule. Many species have only a single stamen and that stamen has only a single locule, an oddity they share only with the genus Canna.

== Taxonomy ==
The APG II system, of 2003 (unchanged from the APG system, 1998), also recognizes this family, and assigns it to the order Zingiberales in the clade commelinids in the monocots. The Marantaceae are considered the most derived family in this group due to the extreme reduction in both stamens and carpels.

The family consists of 28 genera with about 570 known species, found in the tropical areas of the world except in Australia. The biggest concentration is in the Americas, with seven genera in Africa, and six in Asia.

Cladogram: Phylogeny of Zingiberales

- Zingiberales
  - - - Zingiberineae
        - Zingiberariae
          - Zingiberaceae
          - Costaceae
        - Cannariae
          - Cannaceae
          - Marantaceae
      - - Strelitziineae
          - Lowiaceae
          - Strelitziaceae
        - Heliconiaceae
  - - Musaceae

Phylogenetic tree of the family.

- Marantaceae
  - - - - - Clade Maranta
            - - - - Ctenanthe
                  - Stromanthe
                - - Myrosma
                  - Saranthe
              - - - Koernickanthe
                  - Maranta
                - Hylaeanthe
            - - Halopegia
              - Indianthus
          - Clade Stachyphrynium
            - - Afrocalathea
              - Stachyphrynium
            - - - Ataenidia
                - Marantochloa
              - Monophyllanthe
        - Clade Calathea
          - - - - Ischnosiphon
                - Pleiostachya
              - - Calathea
                - Sanblasia
            - Monotagma
          - Goeppertia
      - Clade Donax
        - - - - Phrynium
              - Phacelophrynium
            - Cominsia
          - - Donax
            - Schumannianthus
        - Thalia
    - Clade Sarcophrynium
      - - - Trachyphrynium
          - Hypselodelphys
        - Sarcophrynium
      - - Megaphrynium
        - Thaumatococcus
  - Clade Haumania
    Haumania

== Genera ==
28 genera are accepted.

- Clade Haumania
  - Haumania J.Léonard
- Clade Sarcophrynium
  - Hypselodelphys (K.Schum.) Milne-Redh.
  - Megaphrynium Milne-Redh.
  - Sarcophrynium K.Schum.
  - Thaumatococcus Benth.
  - Trachyphrynium Benth.
- Clade Donax
  - Donax Lour.
  - Myanmaranthus Nob.Tanaka, Suksathan & K.Armstr.
  - Phrynium Willd. (synonyms Cominsia Hemsl., Monophrynium K.Schum., and Phacelophrynium K.Schum.)
  - Schumannianthus Gagnep.
  - Thalia L.
- Clade Calathea
  - Calathea G.Mey.
  - Goeppertia Nees
  - Ischnosiphon Körn.
  - Monotagma K.Schum.
  - Pleiostachya K.Schum.
  - Sanblasia L.Andersson
- Clade Stachyphrynium
  - Afrocalathea K.Schum.
  - Marantochloa Brongn. ex Gris (synonym Ataenidia Gagnep.)
  - Monophyllanthe K.Schum.
  - Stachyphrynium K.Schum.
- Clade Maranta
  - Ctenanthe Eichler
  - Halopegia K.Schum.
  - Indianthus Suksathan & Borchs.
  - Maranta Plum. ex L. (synonyms Hylaeanthe A.M.E.Jonker & Jonker and Koernickanthe L.Andersson)
  - Myrosma L.f.
  - Saranthe (Regel & Körn.) Eichler
  - Stromanthe Sond.

== Seed dispersal ==
Arilated seeds of Marantaceae are dispersed mainly by birds and mammals. In Amazonia, crickets and ants are important secondary dispersers.

== Phytochemistry ==
Rosmarinic acid can be found in plants in the family Marantaceae such as species in the genera Maranta (Maranta leuconeura, Maranta depressa) and Thalia (Thalia geniculata).

== Rapid plant movement: secondary pollination presentation ==
Marantaceae have a distinctive pollination mechanism that is defined by an explosive style movement. It is commonly termed explosive because the action is swift, occurs only one time for each flower, and is irreversible. This quick pollination event plays a significant role in optimizing mating and has been hypothesized to be a factor in the high level of speciation within this family. There are two parts of the floral anatomy that contribute to the explosive pollination mechanism: the style and the hooded staminode.

The secondary pollination presentation begins after a mechanical stimulus is introduced by a pollinator on the trigger appendage of the hooded staminode. Touching this trigger causes the release of the style from the contacted staminode, leading to rapid inward rolling of the style which is no longer being held under high tension. During this quick rolling movement, self pollen (located on top of the style) is deposited on the pollinator while cross-pollen is scooped off the pollinator into the stigmatic cavity. This single action occurs very quickly with the full movement being clocked in at around 0.03 seconds.

== Uses ==
The most well-known species in the family is arrowroot (Maranta arundinacea), a plant of the Caribbean, grown in parts of the Caribbean, Australasia, and sub-Saharan Africa for its easily digestible starch known as arrowroot. It is grown commercially in the West Indies and tropical Americas.

Several species of genus Goeppertia are grown as houseplants for their large ornamental leaves, which are variegated in shades of green, white, and pink. Other genera grown for houseplants include Stromanthe, Ctenanthe, Calathea, and Maranta.

Calathea lutea has tough, durable leaves used to make waterproof baskets, and in the Caribbean and Central America, its leaves are used for roofing. Two Mexican species - C. macrosepala and C. violacea - have flowers that are cooked and used as vegetables. C. allouia or leren, from the West Indies and tropical America, is known as sweet corn root for its edible tuber.

Schumannianthus dichotomus is used for weaving mats to use on floors and beds.

Prayer plant "praying", i.e., raising its leaves for the evening

== See also ==
- List of foliage plant diseases (Maranthaceae)

== Bibliography ==
- Andersson, Lennart (1981). "The neotropical genera of Marantaceae. Circumscription and relationships". Nordic Journal of Botany. 1 (2): 218–245. Bibcode:1981NorJB...1..218A. doi:10.1111/j.1756-1051.1981.tb00692.x. ISSN 0107-055X.
- Sass, C; Iles, WJ; Barrett, CF; Smith, SY; Specht, CD (21 January 2016). "Revisiting the Zingiberales: using multiplexed exon capture to resolve ancient and recent phylogenetic splits in a charismatic plant lineage". PeerJ. 4 e1584. Bibcode:2016PeerJ...4e1584S. doi:10.7717/peerj.1584. PMC 4727956. PMID 26819846.
