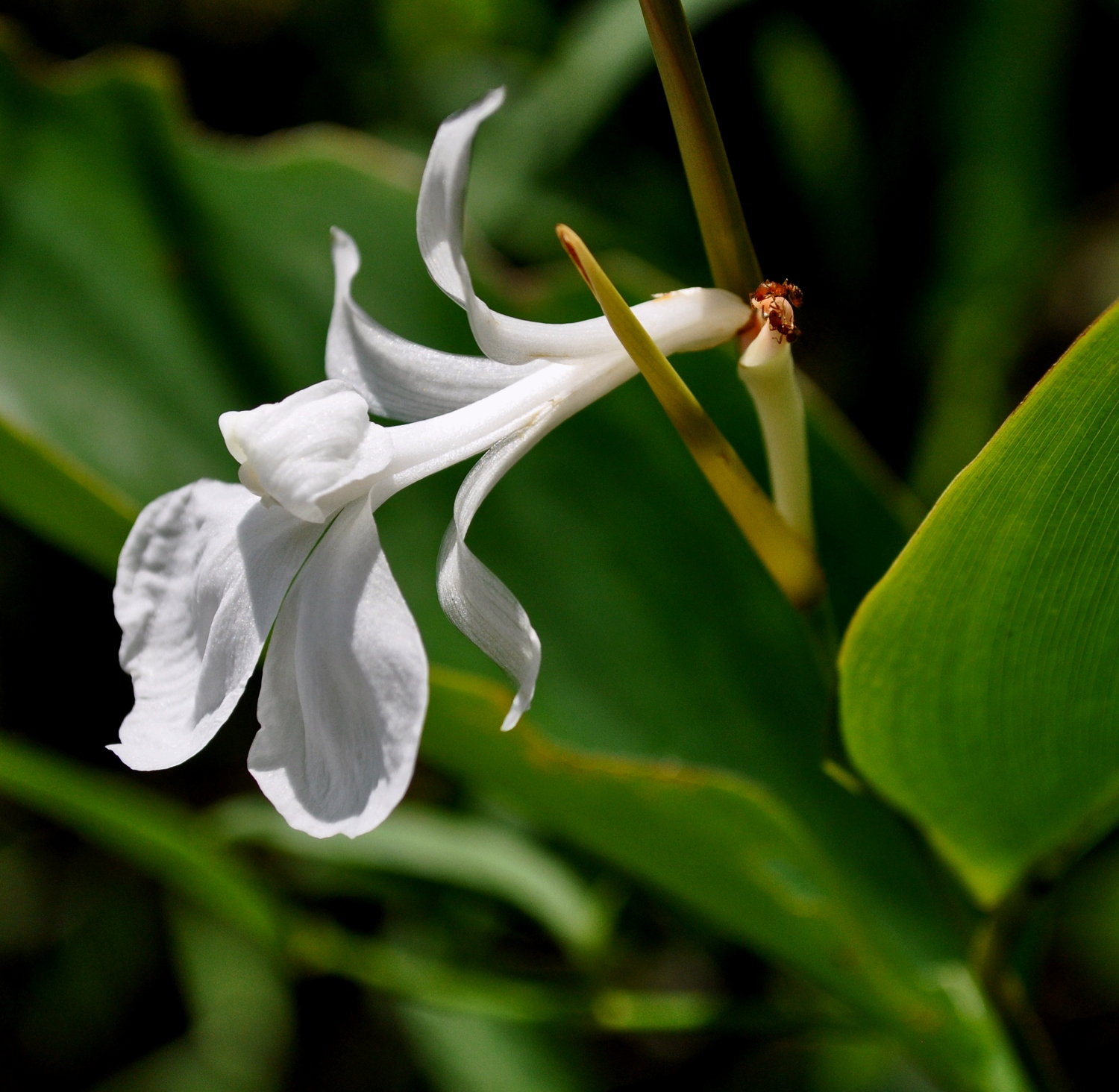

Scientific classification
- Kingdom: Plantae
- Clade: Tracheophytes
- Clade: Angiosperms
- Clade: Monocots
- Clade: Commelinids
- Order: Zingiberales
- Family: Marantaceae
- Genus: Donax; Lour.
- Species: D. canniformis

Binomial name
- Donax canniformis (G.Forst.) K.Schum.

Synonyms
- Genera: Arundastrum Rumph. ex Kuntze; Actoplanes K.Schum.; Ilythuria Raf.; Species: Actoplanes canniformis (G.Forst.) K.Schum.; Arundastrum canniforme (G.Forst.) Kuntze; Clinogyne canniformis (G.Forst.) K.Schum.; Ilythuria canniformis (G.Forst.) Raf.; Phrynium canniforme (G.Forst.) Schrank; Thalia canniformis G.Forst.; Actoplanes grandis (Miq.) K.Schum.; Actoplanes ridleyi K.Schum.; Arundastrum grande (Miq.) Kuntze; Clinogyne dichotoma Salisb. ex Benth.; Clinogyne grandis (Miq.) Benth. & Hook.f.; Donax arundastrum Lour.; Donax gracilis K.Schum.; Donax grandis (Miq.) Ridl.; Donax parviflora Ridl.; Maranta arundastrum (Lour.) M.R.Almeida; Maranta arundinacea Blanco; Maranta dichotoma D.Dietr.; Maranta grandis Miq.; Maranta tonchat Blume; Phrynium arundastrum Rumph. ex Reider; Phrynium dichotomum Roxb.

= Donax canniformis =

Species of flowering plant

Donax is a monotypic genus of flowering plants in the family Marantaceae. It contains only one recognized species, Donax canniformis (G.Forst.) K.Schum, widespread from the Andaman Islands, Myanmar (Burma), southern China, Southeast Asia, New Guinea, Melanesia and Micronesia.

In Vietnam, fibers from the stems of Donax canniformis are used to weave baskets and mats.
