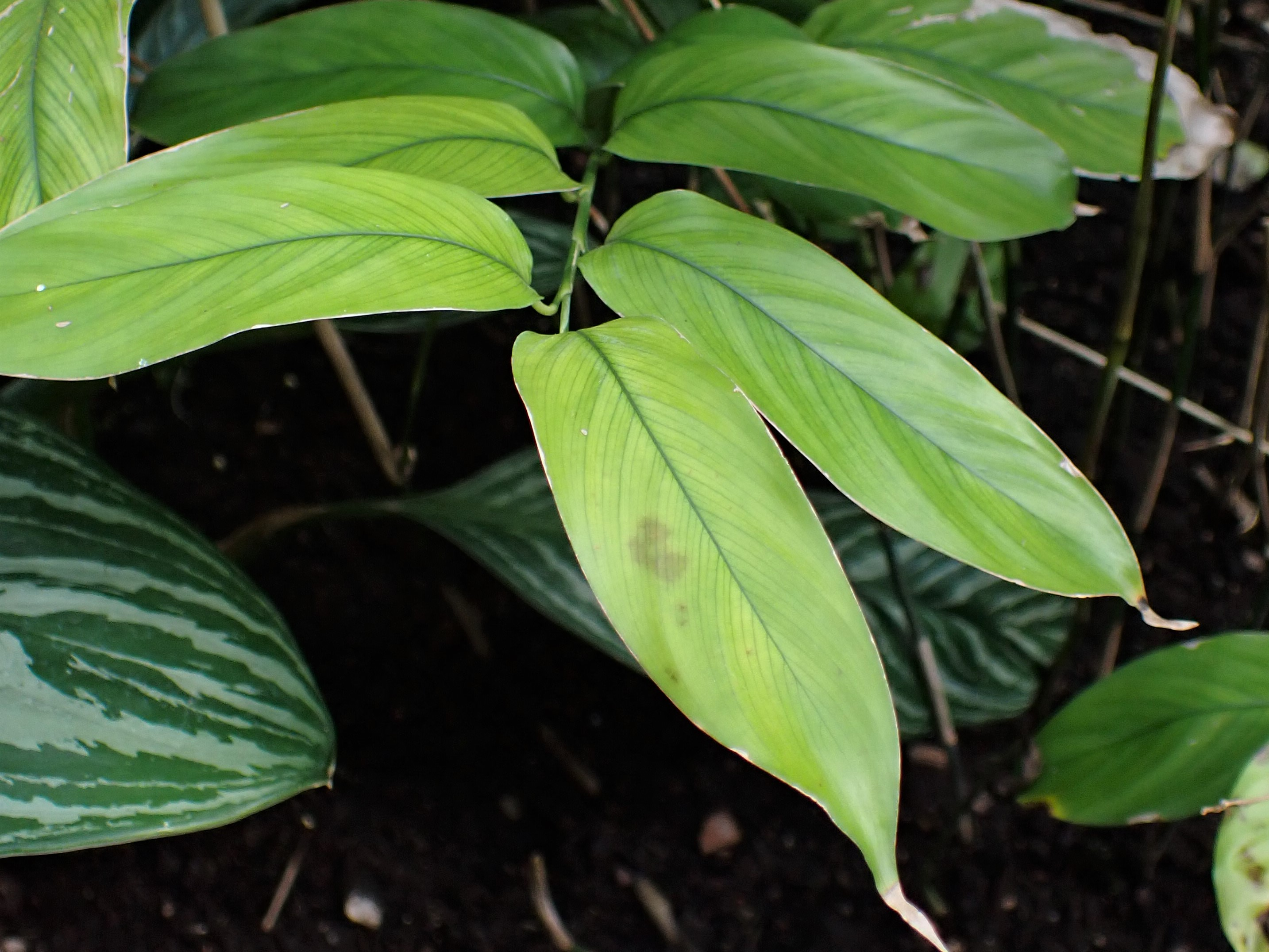

Scientific classification
- Kingdom: Plantae
- Clade: Tracheophytes
- Clade: Angiosperms
- Clade: Monocots
- Clade: Commelinids
- Order: Zingiberales
- Family: Marantaceae
- Genus: Trachyphrynium; Benth.
- Species: T. braunianum

Binomial name
- Trachyphrynium braunianum (K.Schum.) Baker

Synonyms
- Hybophrynium K.Schum.; Bamburanta L.Linden

= Trachyphrynium =

Species of plant

Trachyphrynium is a monotypic genus of plants native to tropical Africa. The only recognized species is Trachyphrynium braunianum (K.Schum.) Baker, widespread from Liberia to Uganda.
