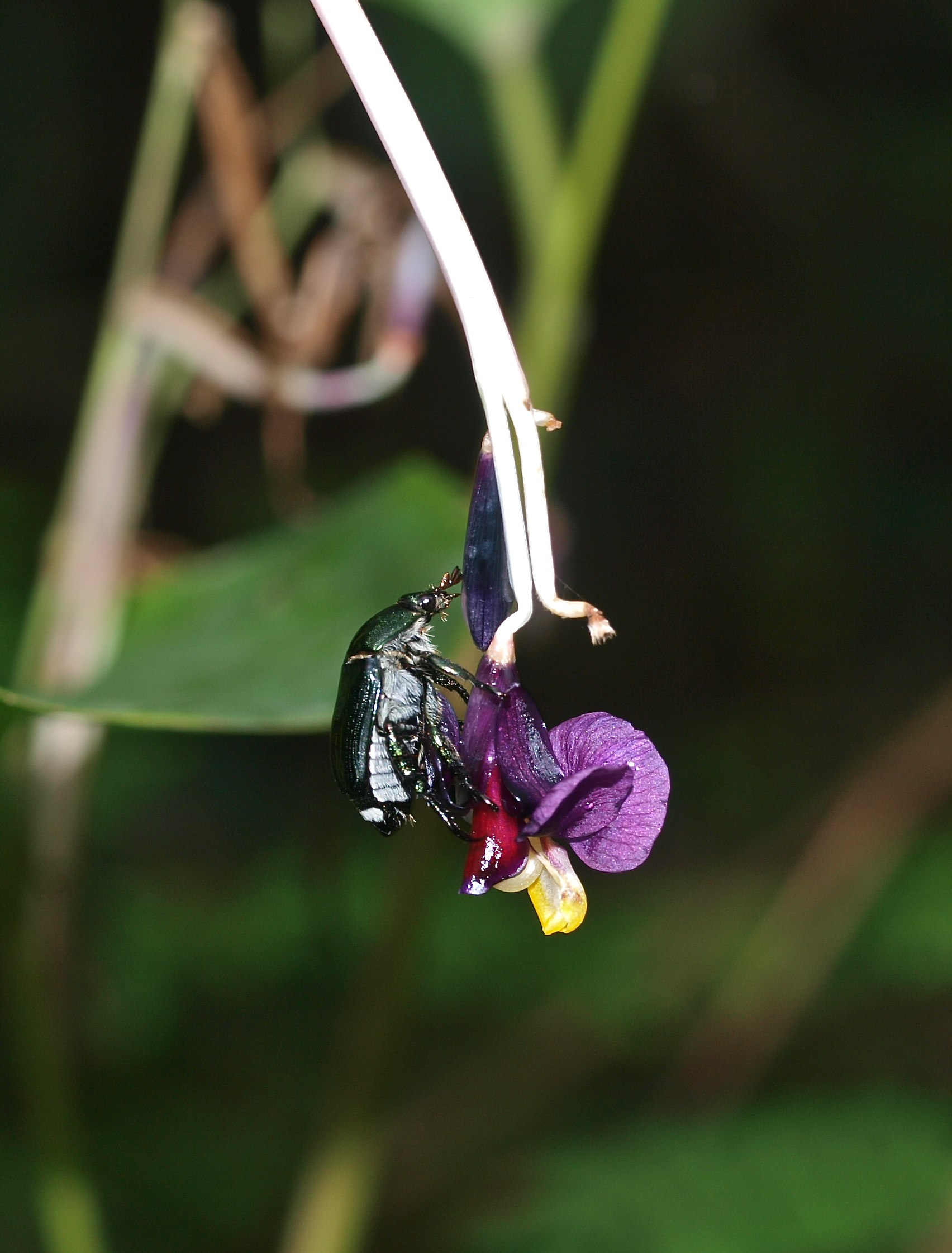
- Hypselodelphys poggeana

Scientific classification
- Kingdom: Plantae
- Clade: Tracheophytes
- Clade: Angiosperms
- Clade: Monocots
- Clade: Commelinids
- Order: Zingiberales
- Family: Marantaceae
- Genus: Hypselodelphys (K.Schum.) Milne-Redh.

Synonyms
- Trachyphrynium sect. Hypselodelphys K. Schum.

= Hypselodelphys =

Genus of flowering plants

Hypselodelphys is a group of plants in the Marantaceae described as a genus in 1950. native to tropical Africa from Liberia to Uganda and south to Angola. It contains 8 recognized species:

species

- Hypselodelphys hirsuta – Cameroon, Gabon, Equatorial Guinea
- Hypselodelphys lopei – Gabon
- Hypselodelphys poggeana – tropical Africa from Liberia to Angola
- Hypselodelphys scandens – Central Africa from Nigeria to Uganda and Angola
- Hypselodelphys triangularis – Liberia, Ghana, Ivory Coast, Togo
- Hypselodelphys velutina – Liberia, Sierra Leone, Ivory Coast
- Hypselodelphys violacea – tropical Africa from Liberia to Angola
- Hypselodelphys zenkeriana – Cameroon, Gabon, Equatorial Guinea, Republic of the Congo, Democratic Republic of the Congo
