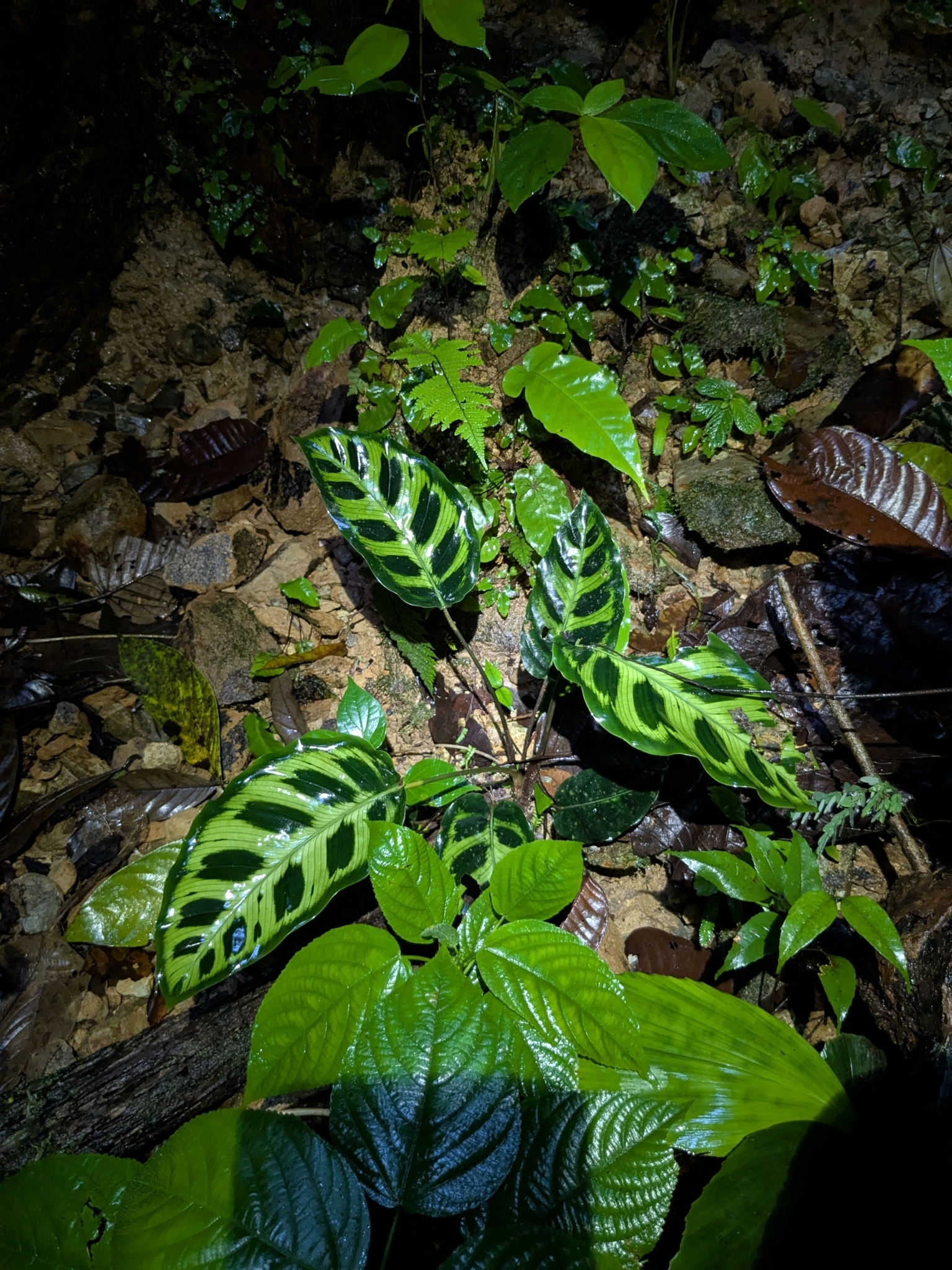

Scientific classification
- Kingdom: Plantae
- Clade: Embryophytes
- Clade: Tracheophytes
- Clade: Spermatophytes
- Clade: Angiosperms
- Clade: Monocots
- Clade: Commelinids
- Order: Zingiberales
- Family: Marantaceae
- Genus: Goeppertia
- Species: G. contrafenestra

Binomial name
- Goeppertia contrafenestra (H.Kenn.) Borchs. & S.Suárez

Synonyms
- Calathea contrafenestra H.Kenn

= Goeppertia contrafenestra =

Species of plant

Goeppertia contrafenestra is a species of plant from the genus Goeppertia in the family Marantaceae. It is native to Colombia, Ecuador and Peru.

== Description ==
Goeppertia contrafenestra is a medium sized plant with pointy, ovale, dark green leaves, with long, thin petioles and a long pulvinus. It has a pattern on the upper side of the leaf with the majority of the leaf being light green with a texture similar to Goeppertia makoyana. On this light green area, it has a few, straight dark green rectangles starting from a few milimeters from the middle vein to a few milimeters from the side of the pattern. The inflorescence of this species is made of multiple bracts around a short peduncle, the inflorescence is somewhat similar to Goeppertia roseopicta or Goeppertia veitchiana. The bracts are green and the flowers are fully white.
