= Banana-families =

Families of plants

The "banana-families" or banana group is a basal paraphyletic assemblage in the order Zingiberales (Monocotyledoneae) that comprises Musaceae (the banana family), Lowiaceae, Strelitziaceae, and Heliconiaceae. These taxa differentiate from the "ginger-families" derived clade by their plesiomorphic state of five or six fertile stamens, and generally have large banana-like leaves that are easily torn between secondary veins.

Morphologically, this is a more homogeneous group than the "ginger-families" clade. In the past the banana families were often combined into the single family Musaceae.

Banana-families

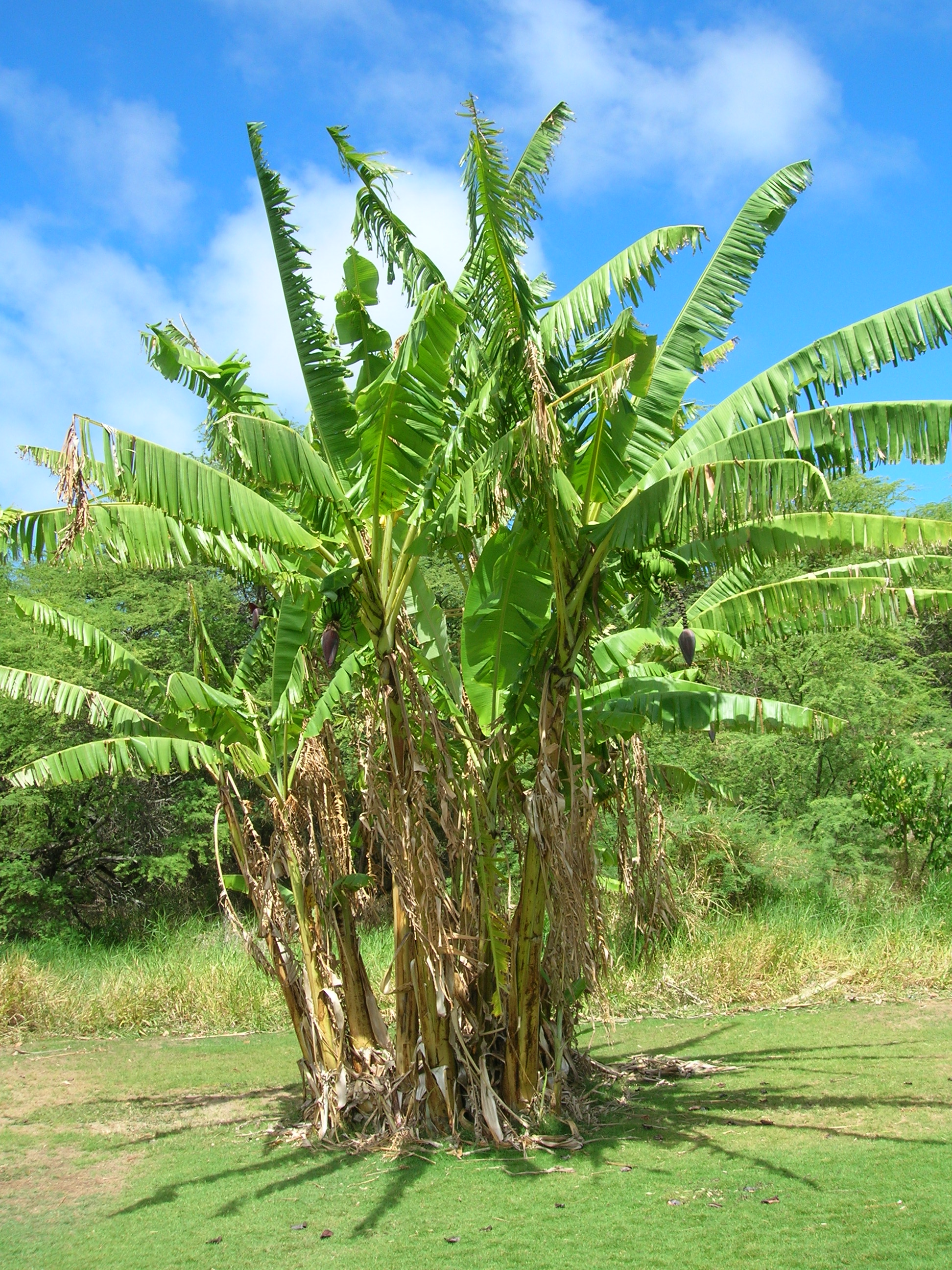
Musa (Musaceae)

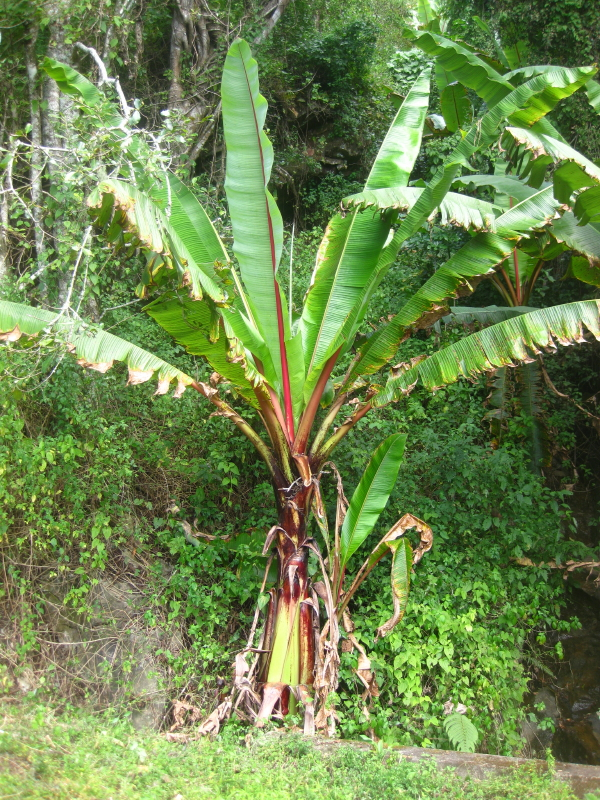
Ensete (Musaceae)

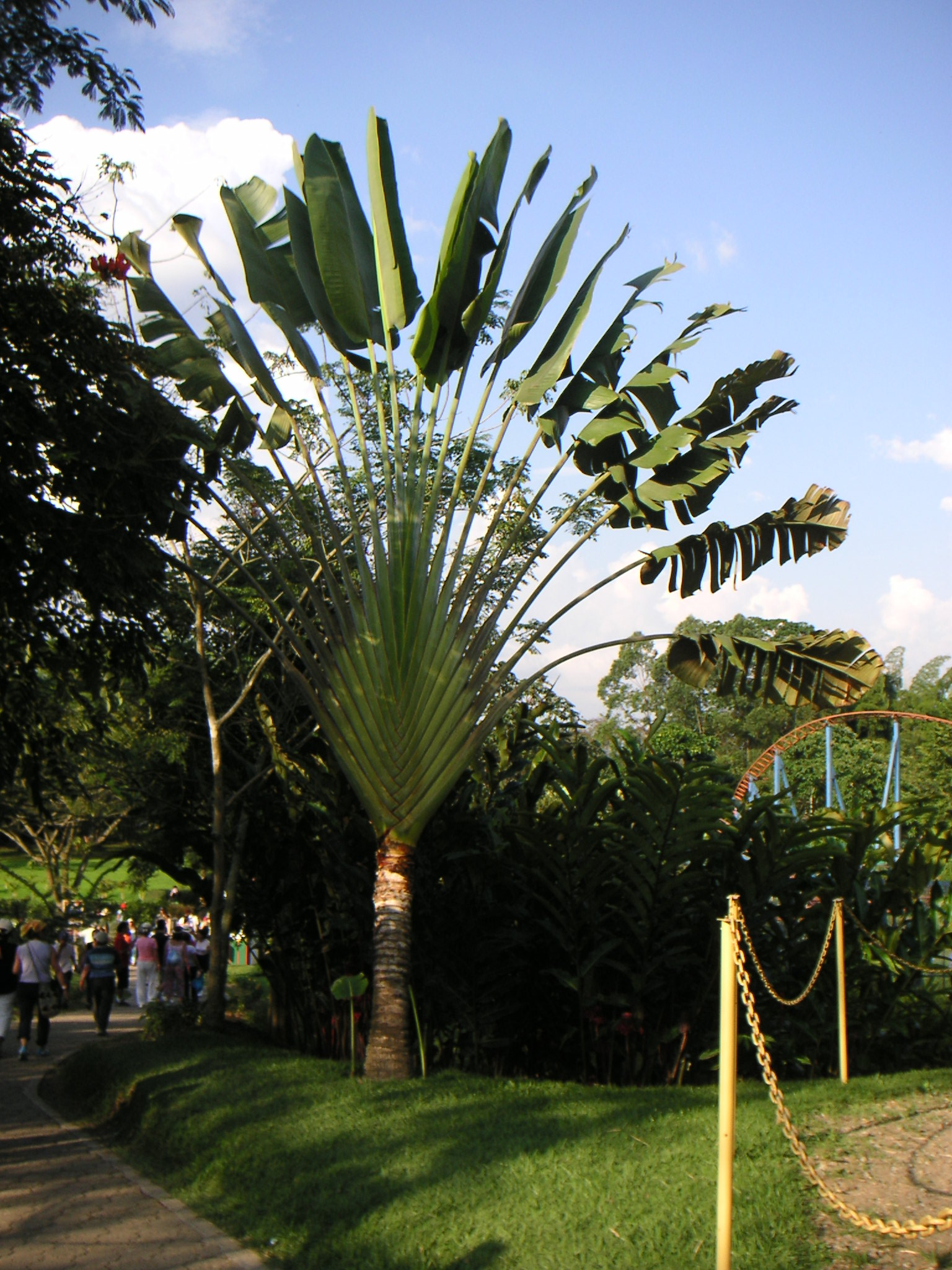
Ravenala madagascariensis (Strelitziaceae)

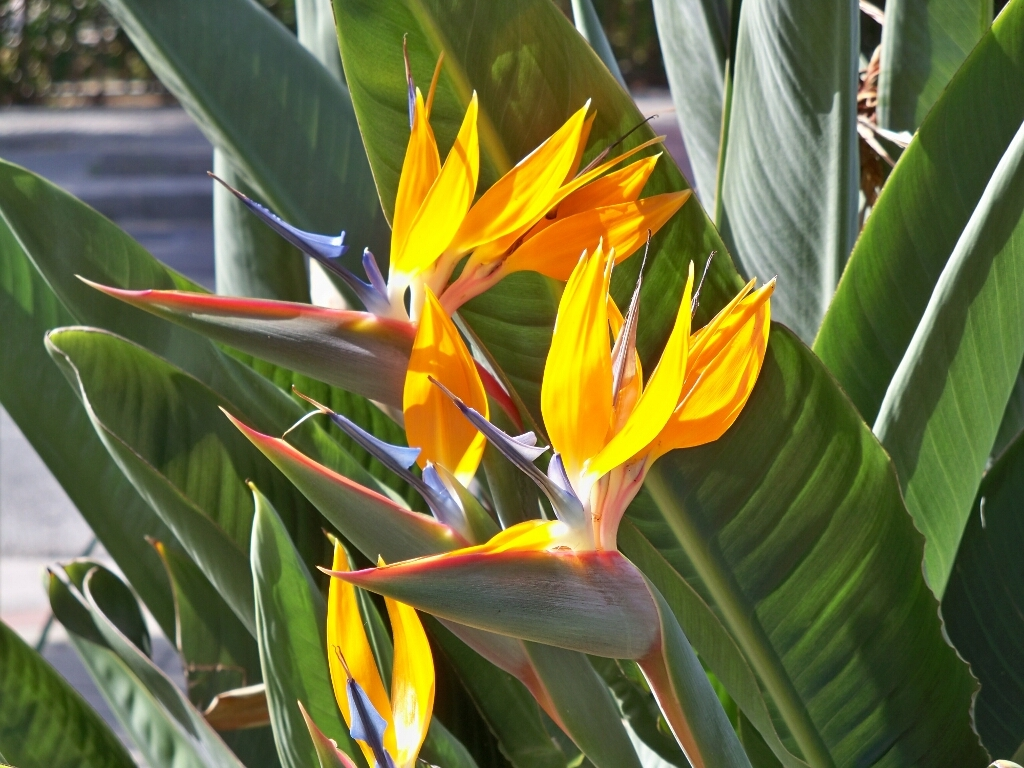
Strelitzia (Strelitziaceae)

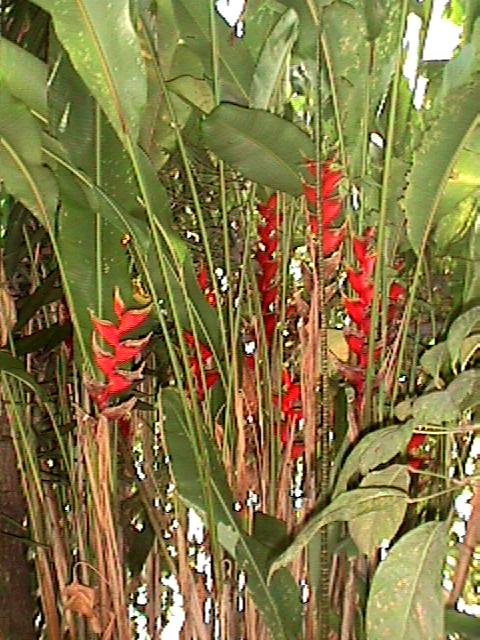
Heliconia (Heliconiaceae)

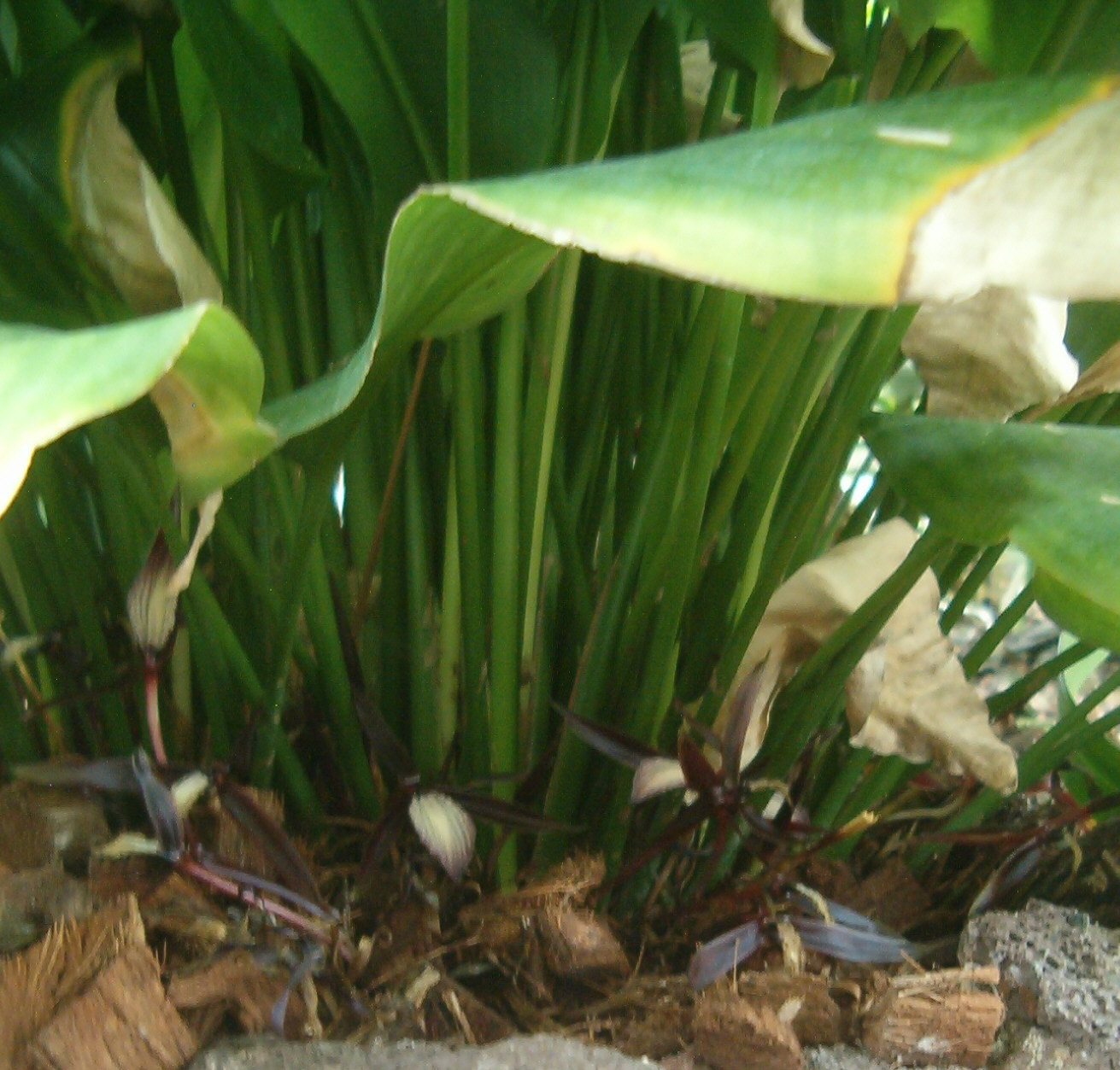
Orchidantha (Lowiaceae)

== See also ==
- Ginger-families ("Core Zingiberales")
- Zingiberales
- Monocotyledoneae
