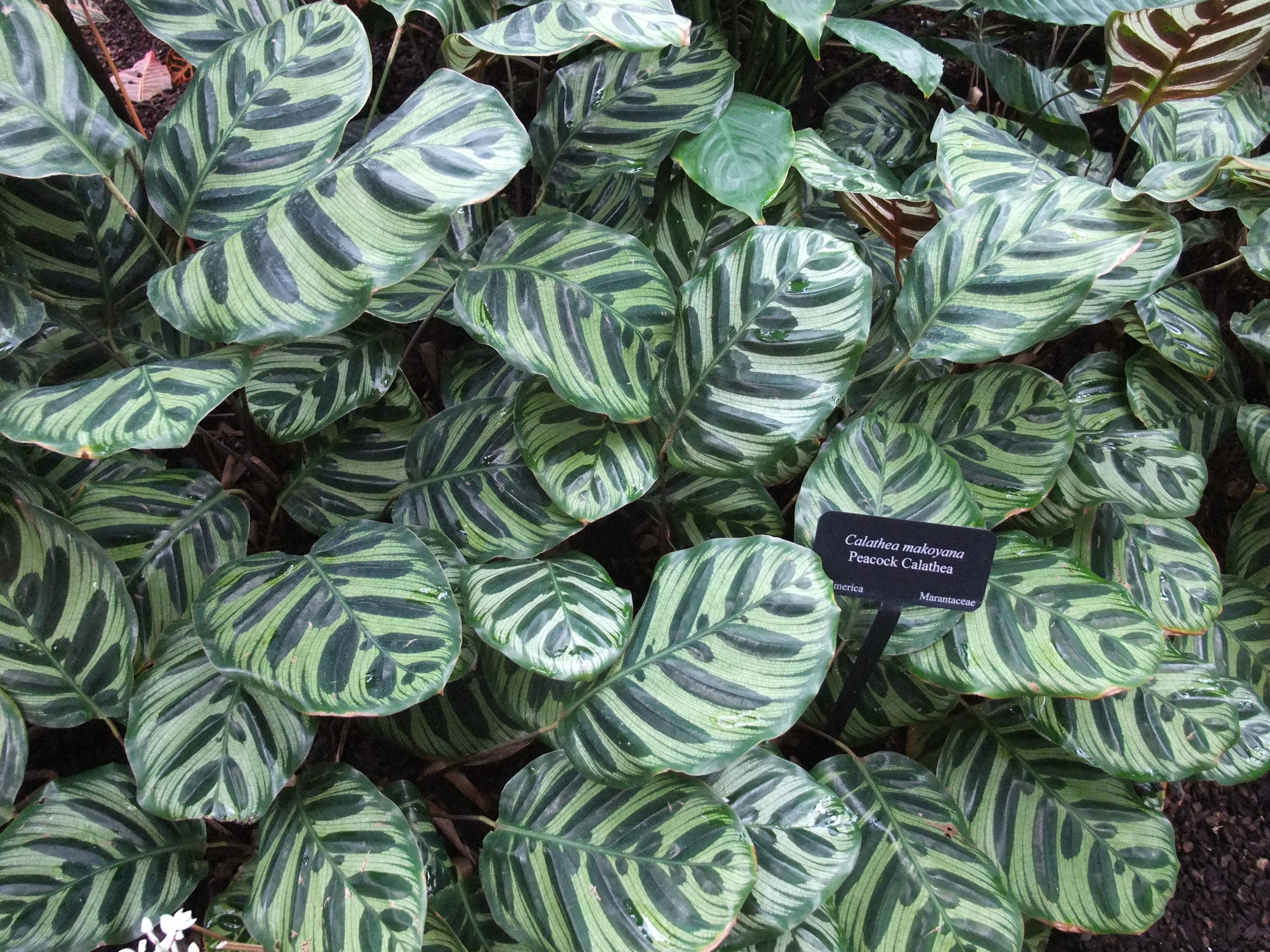

Scientific classification
- Kingdom: Plantae
- Clade: Embryophytes
- Clade: Tracheophytes
- Clade: Spermatophytes
- Clade: Angiosperms
- Clade: Monocots
- Clade: Commelinids
- Order: Zingiberales
- Family: Marantaceae
- Genus: Goeppertia
- Species: G. makoyana

Binomial name
- Goeppertia makoyana (É.Morren) Borchs. & S.Suárez

Synonyms
- Calathea makoyana É.Morren; Calathea olivaris (H.J.Veitch) G.Nicholson; Maranta iconifera W.Bull; Maranta olivaris H.J.Veitch; Phyllodes mackoyana (É.Morren) Kuntze

= Goeppertia makoyana =

Species of flowering plant

Goeppertia makoyana (syn. Calathea makoyana), also known as peacock plant or cathedral windows, is a species of plant belonging to the genus Goeppertia in the family Marantaceae, native to Espírito Santo state of eastern Brazil. It has gained the Royal Horticultural Society's Award of Garden Merit.

== Description ==
Goeppertia makoyana is an evergreen perennial, growing to 45 cm (18 in), with round, pale, glossy green leaves. The upper surfaces of the leaves are marked with dark green blotches along the veins, and the lower surfaces coloured deep purple, with leaf shafts that are very thin. When new leaves grow they are rolled up and display their pinkish-red undersides. Like others in the genus, it has a horizontal soil stem, rhizome, from which the plants grow up and the roots develop. It requires a minimum temperature of 16 °C (61 °F), and in temperate areas is often cultivated as a houseplant.

Like other "prayer plants", this plant also raises and closes its leaves at night and opens them up again as dawn breaks.

== Gallery ==
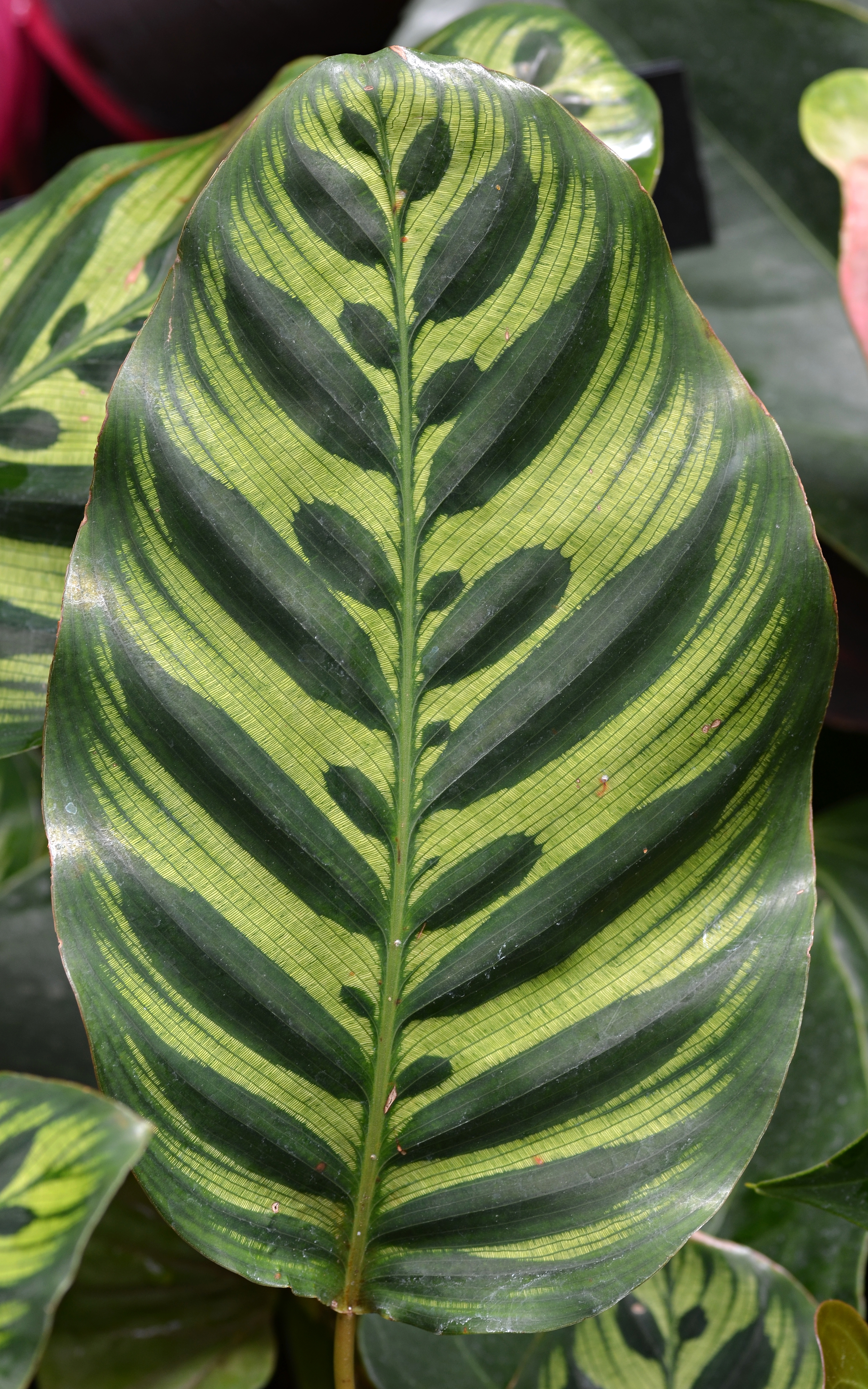
Leaf closeup

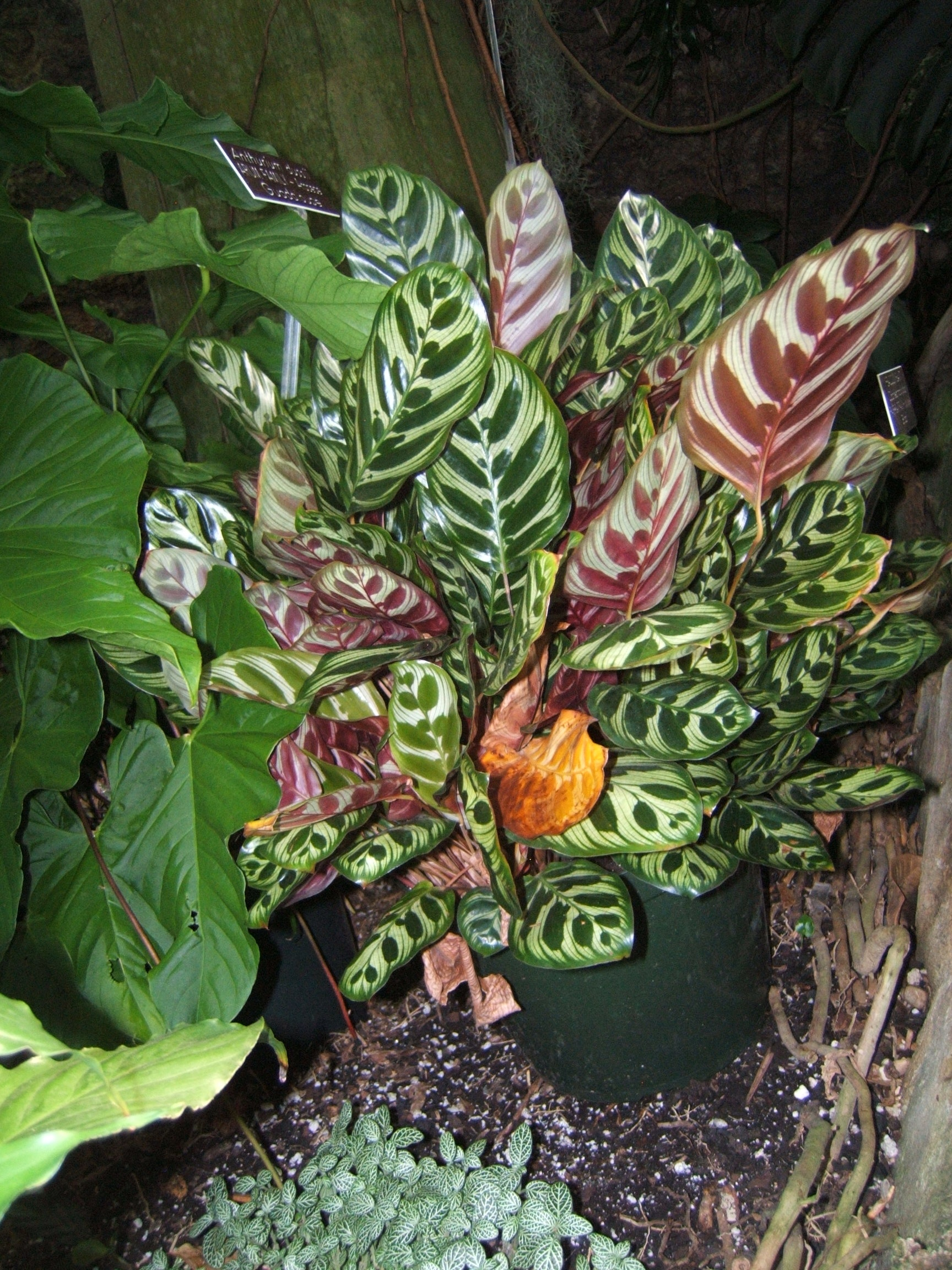
At the US Botanical Garden

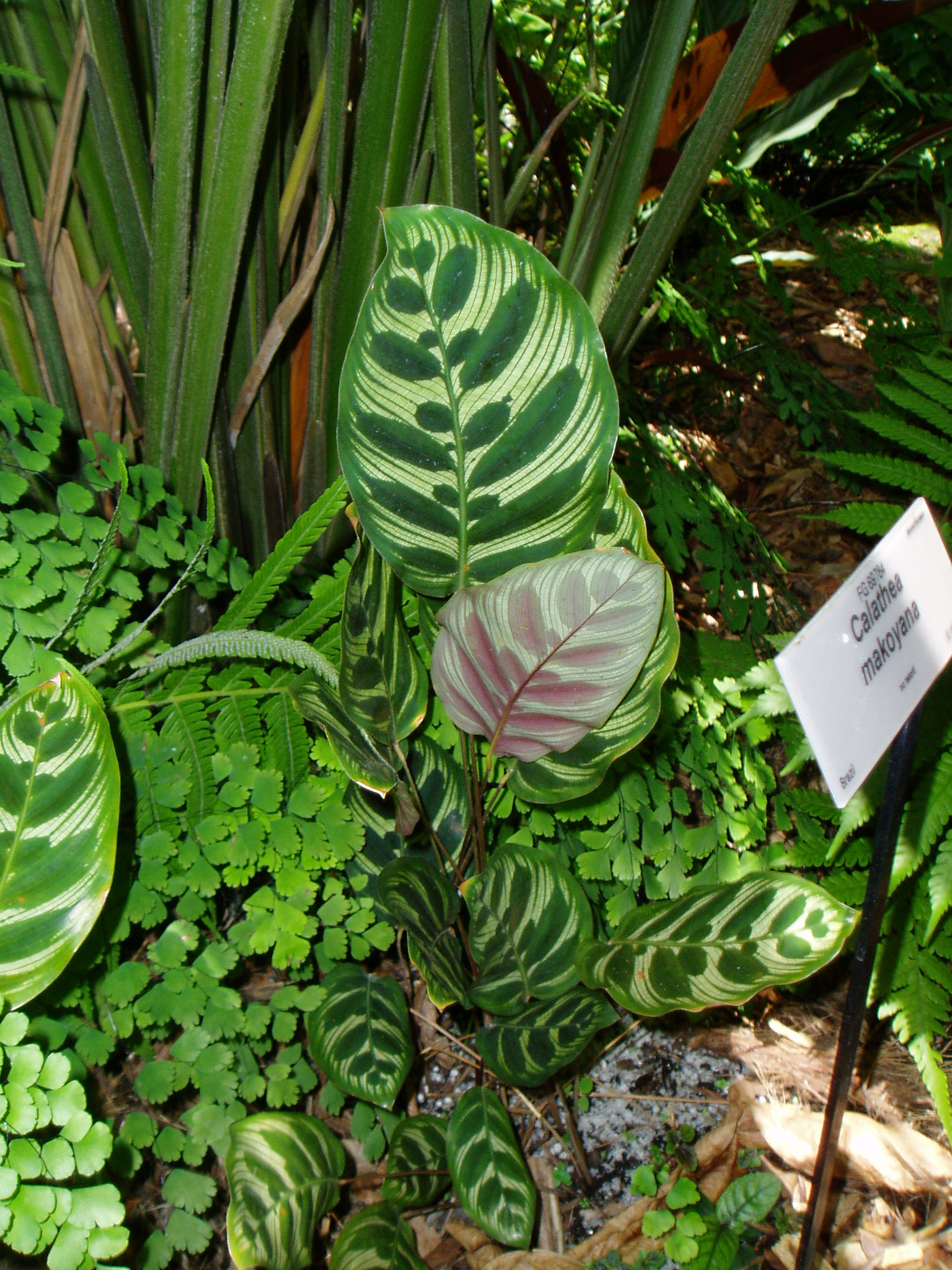
At Fairchild Tropical Botanic Garden, Miami

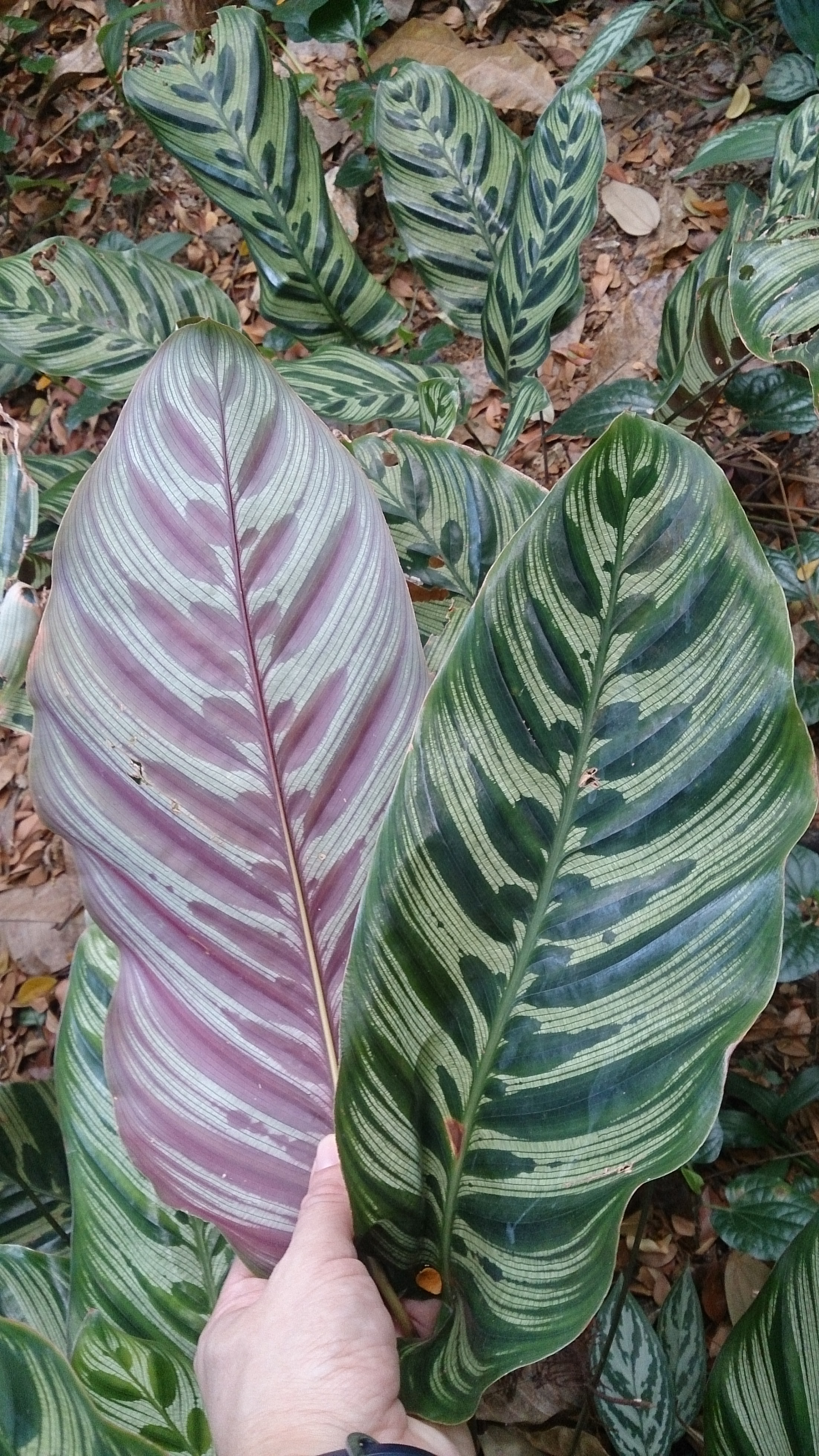
In natural environment

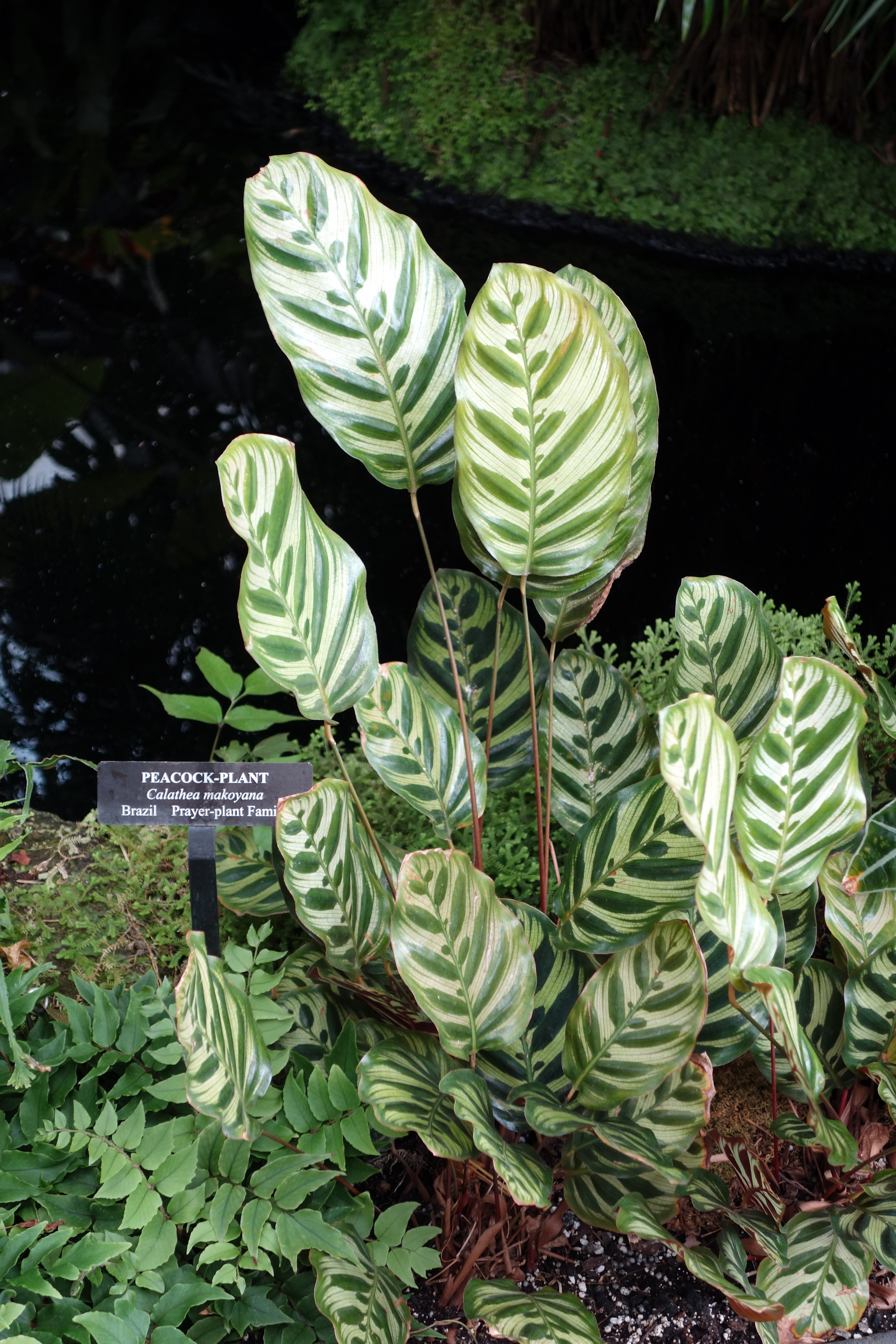
At Longwood Gardens

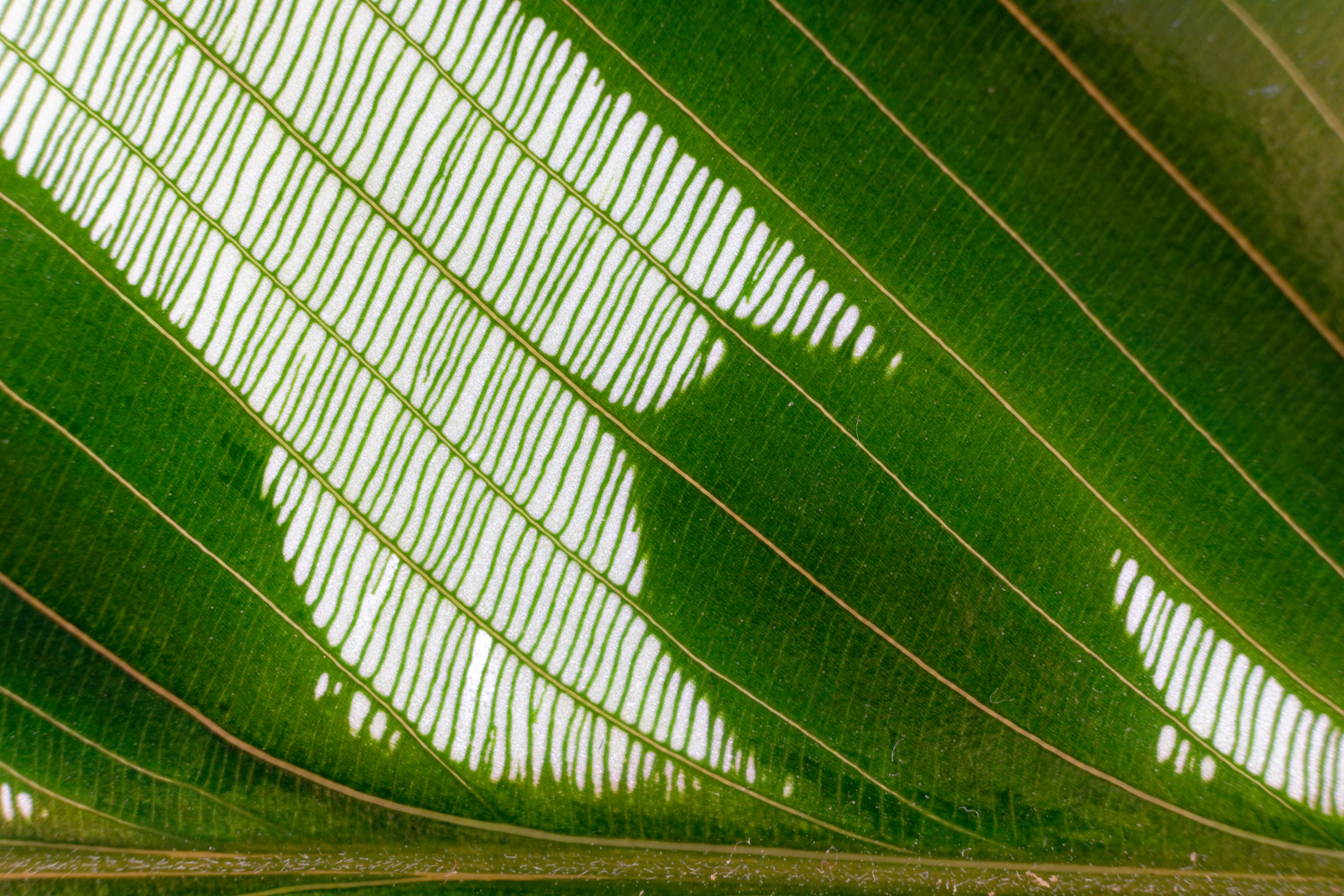
Macro image of a leaf

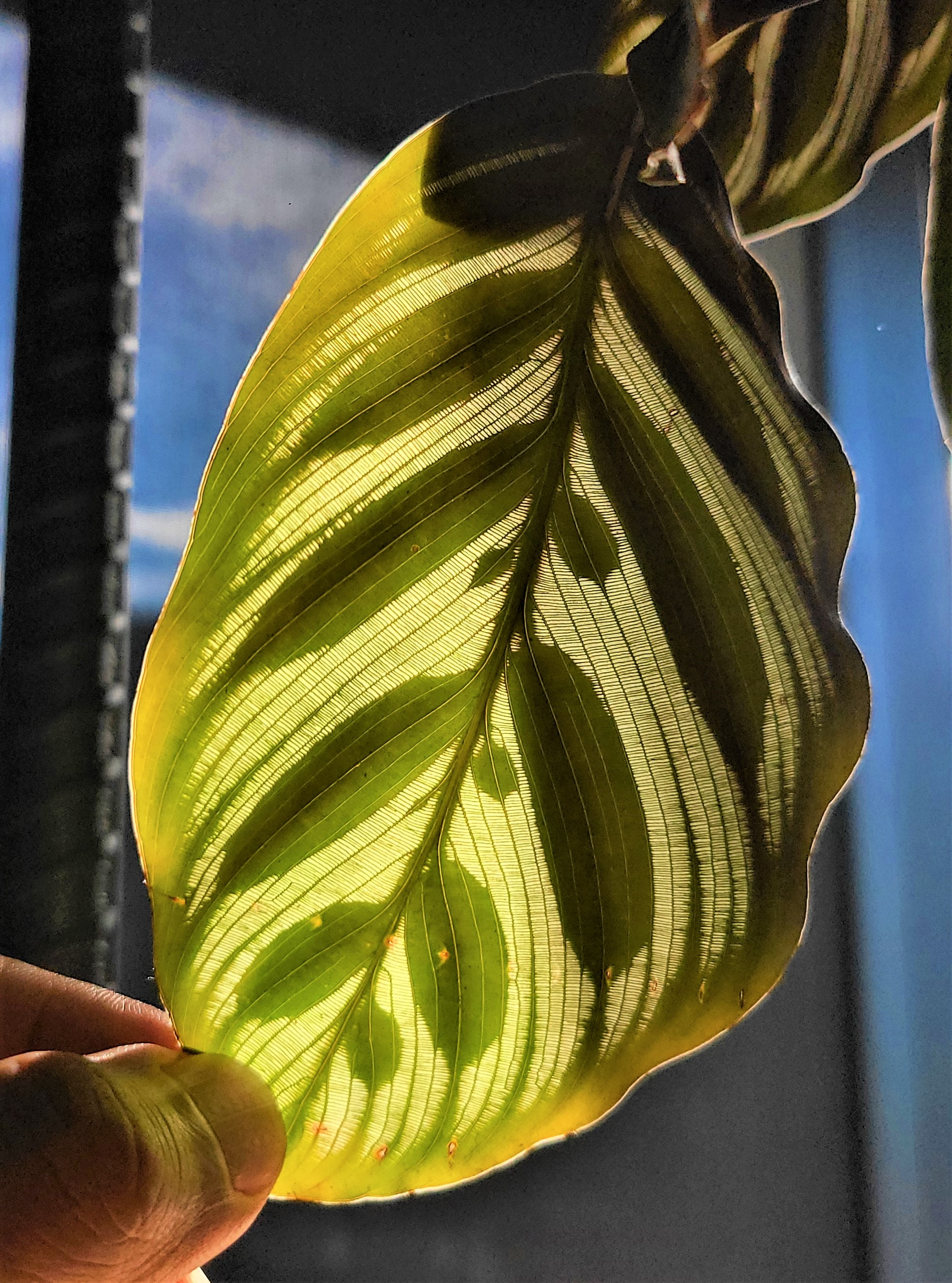
Leaf close up

== See also ==
- Goeppertia roseopicta, a similar looking plant
