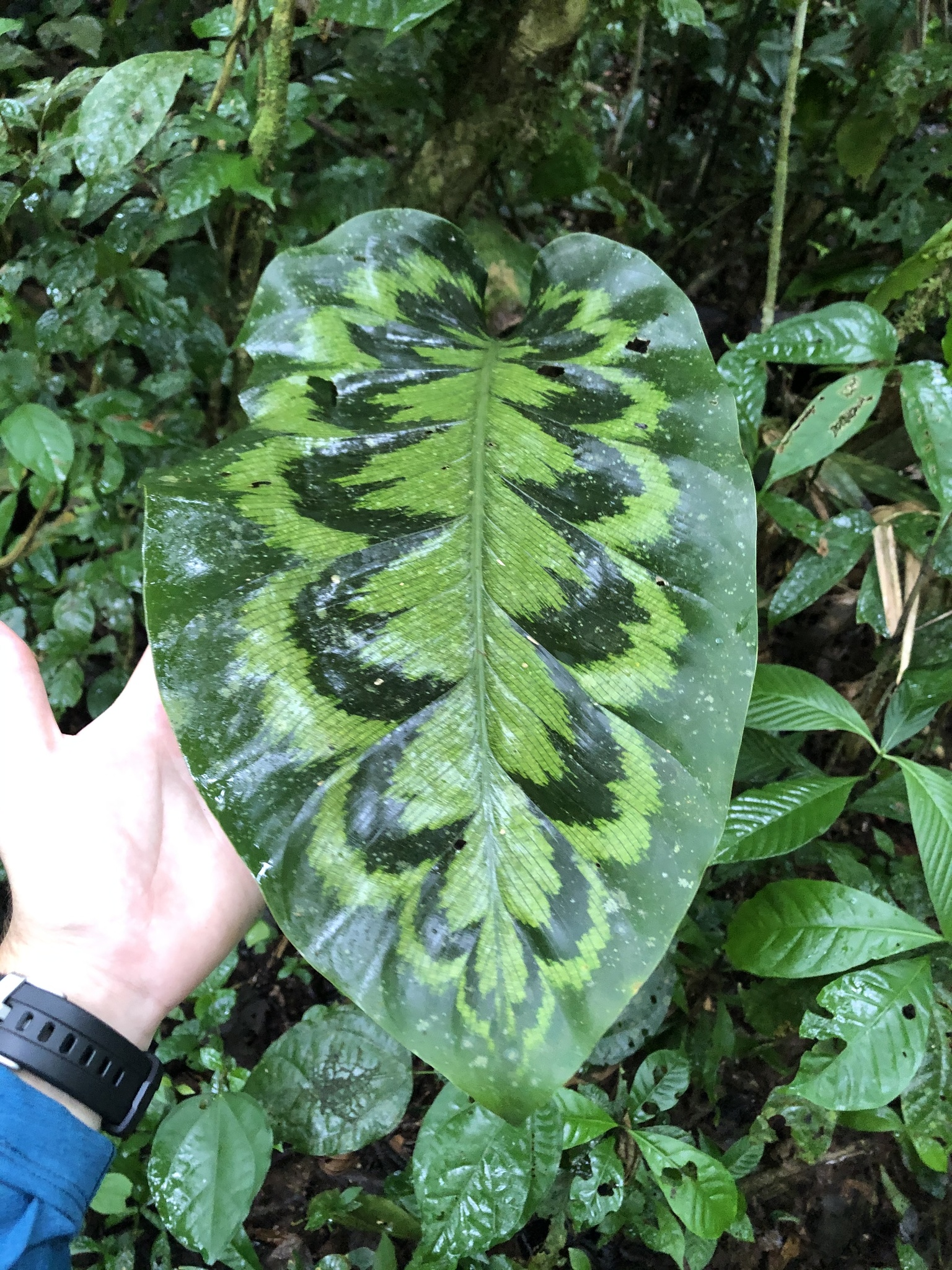

Scientific classification
- Kingdom: Plantae
- Clade: Tracheophytes
- Clade: Angiosperms
- Clade: Monocots
- Clade: Commelinids
- Order: Zingiberales
- Family: Marantaceae
- Genus: Goeppertia
- Species: G. pseudoveitchiana

Binomial name
- Goeppertia pseudoveitchiana (H.Kenn.) Borchs. & S.Suárez

Synonyms
- Calathea pseudoveitchiana H.Kenn.

= Goeppertia pseudoveitchiana =

Species of flowering plant

Goeppertia pseudoveitchiana is a species of plant from the genus Goeppertia in the Marantaceae family. It is native to Peru.

== Description ==
Goeppertia pseudoveitchiana is a medium sized plant with wide, pointy, glossy green leaves. It has long and thin petioles and a long pulvinus. The underside is usually grey-green with two purple bands following the pattern above. Above is a pattern extremely similar to Goeppertia veitchiana, with one wide green band in the middle, two thin dark green bands on each sides of the middle band and two other light green bands on each sides of the dark green bands. The inflorescence of Goeppertia pseudoveitchiana is made of multiple bracts on a peduncle. The inflorescence stays at ground level and is usually hard to see. It has purple bracts and flowers.
