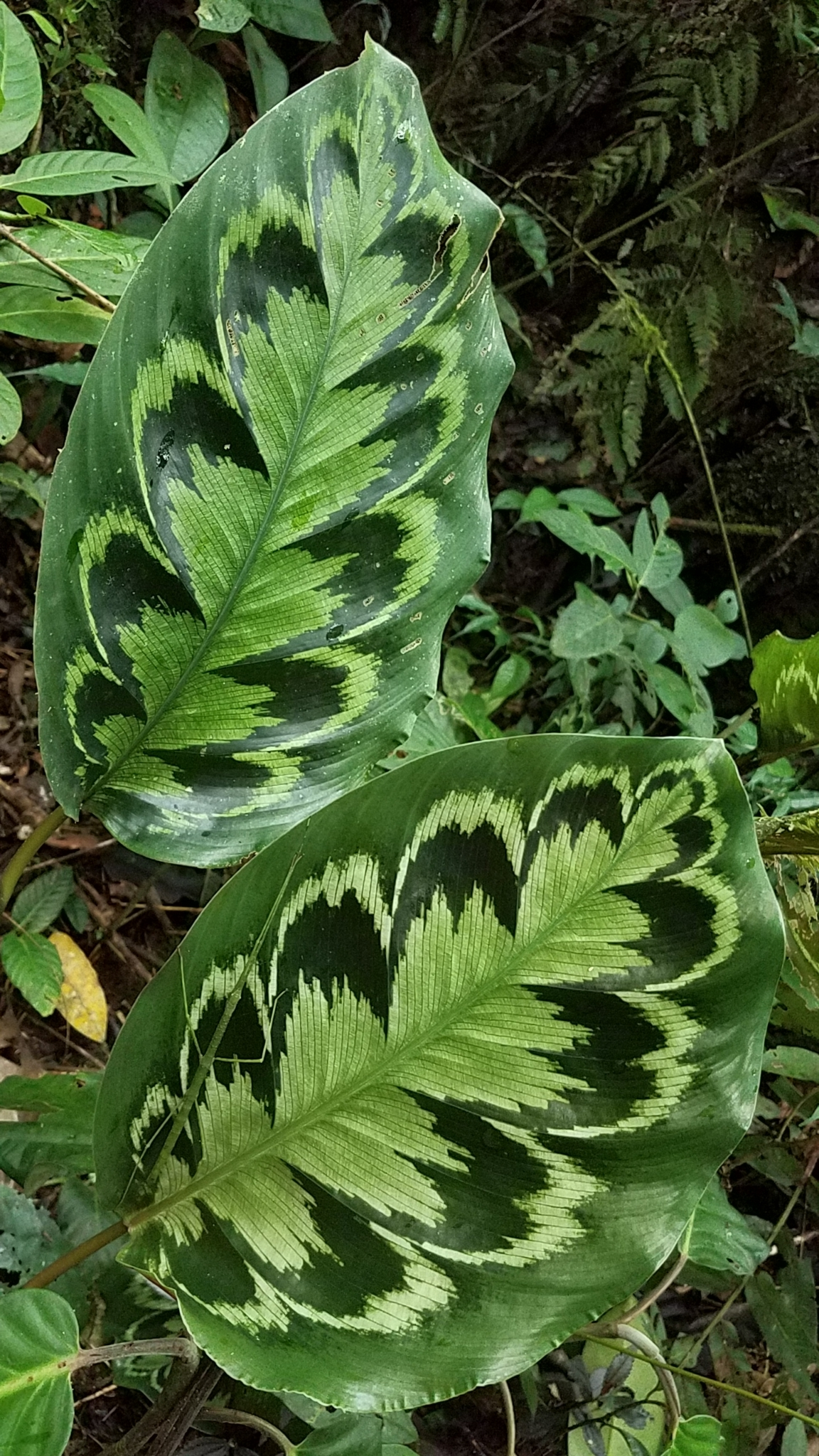

Conservation status
- Near Threatened (IUCN 3.1)

Scientific classification
- Kingdom: Plantae
- Clade: Embryophytes
- Clade: Tracheophytes
- Clade: Spermatophytes
- Clade: Angiosperms
- Clade: Monocots
- Clade: Commelinids
- Order: Zingiberales
- Family: Marantaceae
- Genus: Goeppertia
- Species: G. veitchiana

Binomial name
- Goeppertia veitchiana (Veitch ex Hook.f.) Borchs. & S.Suárez

Synonyms
- Calathea veitchiana Veitch ex Hook.f.; Calathea veitchiana var. foxii Raffill; Maranta veitchiana (Veitch ex Hook.f.) Van Houtte; Phyllodes veitchiana (Veitch ex Hook.f.) Kuntze

= Goeppertia veitchiana =

Species of flowering plant

Goeppertia veitchiana (syn. Calathea veitchiana) is a species of flowering plant in the Marantaceae family. It is endemic to Ecuador. Its natural habitats are subtropical or tropical moist lowland forests and subtropical or tropical moist montane forests.

The plant was discovered near Cuenca by the Victorian plant collector Richard Pearce in 1862, and named in honour of his employers, James Veitch & Sons.

== Description ==
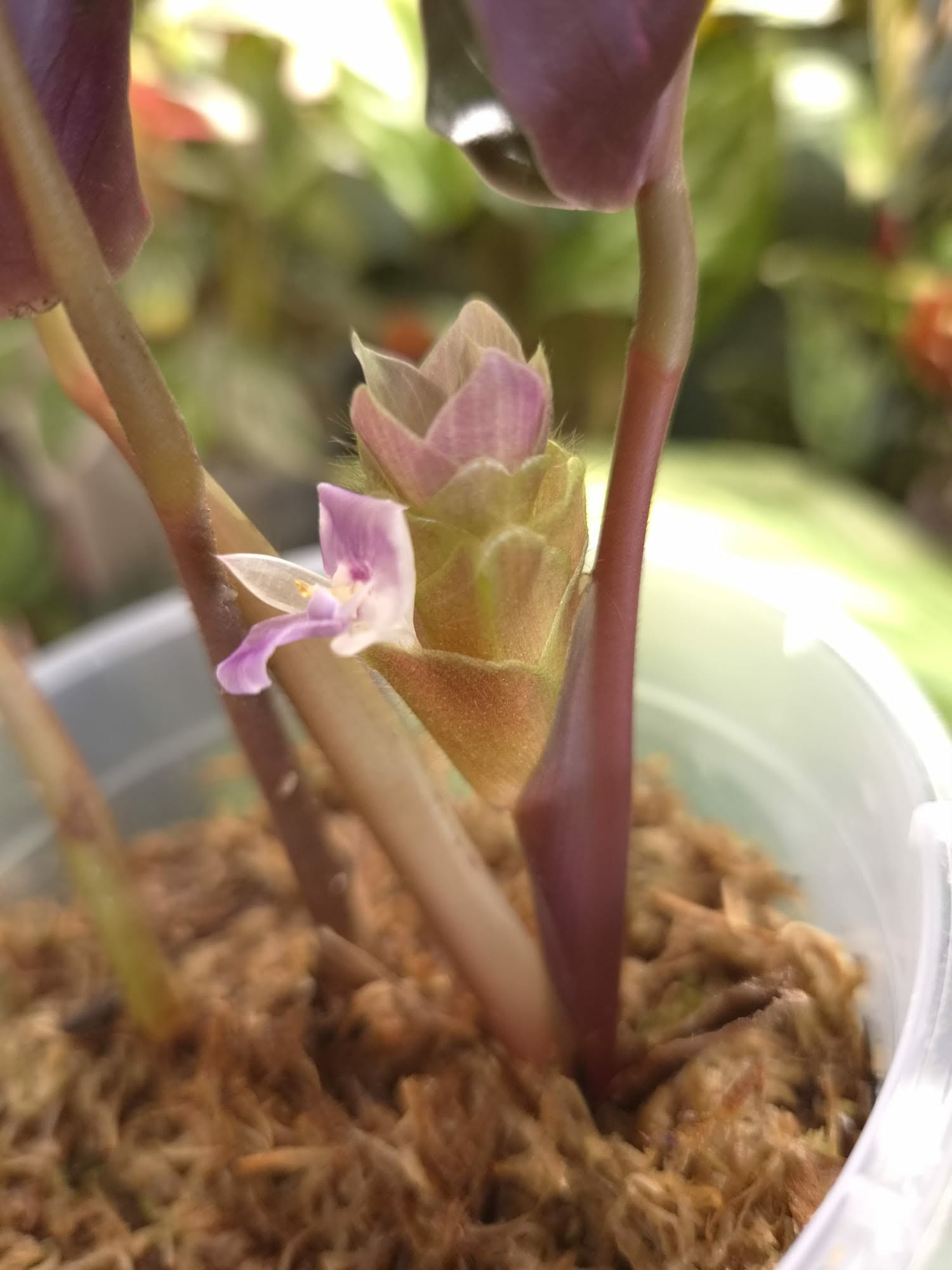
Inflorescence of Goeppertia veitchiana

Goeppertia vetichiana is a medium sized plant with wide, ovale, glossy green leaves. It has long, thin petioles and a long pulvinus. The back of the leaves are often purple. There is a pattern on the upper side of the leaf which makes it very recognizable. It is composed of one wide green band in the middle, with two smaller dark green bands on the edges and with another, two light green bands on each sides of the dark green ones. The inflorescence of G. veitchiana is similar to Goeppertia roseopicta, but the bracts are very hairy. The bracts can be purple or green and the flowers are white with often two purple staminodes.

== Similar species ==
In 1983, a new species of Calathea was described from Peru, that, although not closely related to C. veitchiana, shows the same leaf pattern and had been previously misidentified in collections as C. veitchiana. This new species was named Calathea pseudoveitchiana, and is now Goeppertia pseudoveitchiana.
