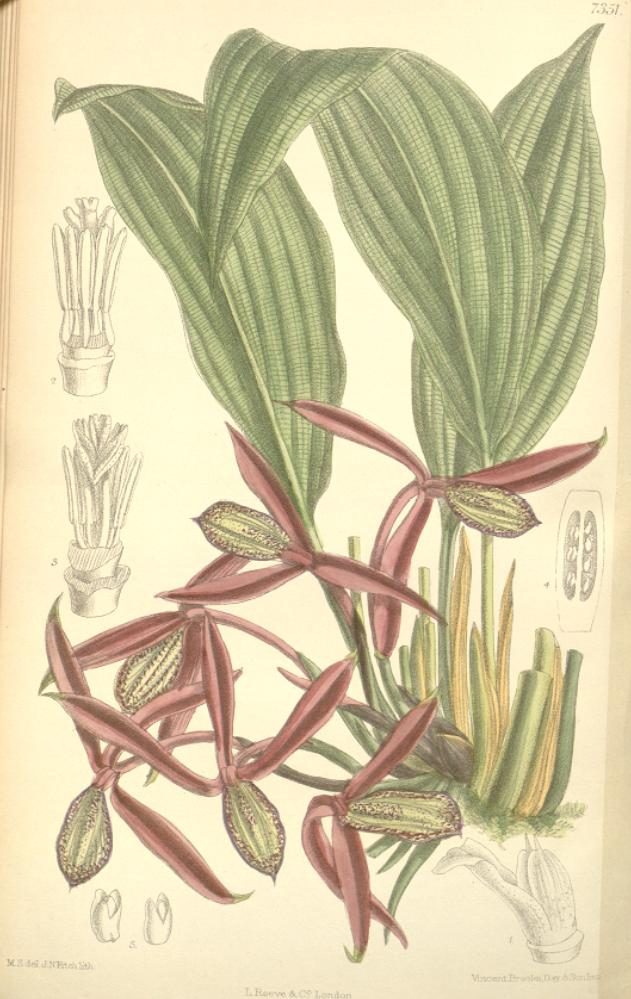
- Orchidantha maxillarioides

Scientific classification
- Kingdom: Plantae
- Clade: Tracheophytes
- Clade: Angiosperms
- Clade: Monocots
- Clade: Commelinids
- Order: Zingiberales
- Family: Lowiaceae; Ridl.
- Genus: Orchidantha; N.E.Br.

Type species
- Orchidantha borneensi N.E.Br.

Synonyms
- Lowia Scort. 1886 not Hook.f. 1894; Lowia Hook.f. 1894 not Scort. 1886; Protamomum Ridl. 1893

= Orchidantha =

Genus of flowering plants

Orchidantha is a genus of flowering plants. In the APG III system, it is placed in the family Lowiaceae, as the sole genus. It includes the plants in the formerly recognised genera Lowia and Protamomum.

Orchidantha remains a poorly known genus, found from southern China to Borneo. Orchidantha means "orchid-flower", as one of the petals on the flowers is modified into a labellum, like the flowers of orchids. One species, Orchidantha inouei of Borneo, imitates the smell of dung in order to attract small Onthophagus dung beetles as pollinators.

== Taxonomy ==
Cladogram: Phylogeny of Zingiberales

- Zingiberales
  - - - Zingiberineae
        - Zingiberariae
          - Zingiberaceae
          - Costaceae
        - Cannariae
          - Cannaceae
          - Marantaceae
      - - Strelitziineae
          - Lowiaceae
          - Strelitziaceae
        - Heliconiaceae
  - - Musaceae

=== Species ===
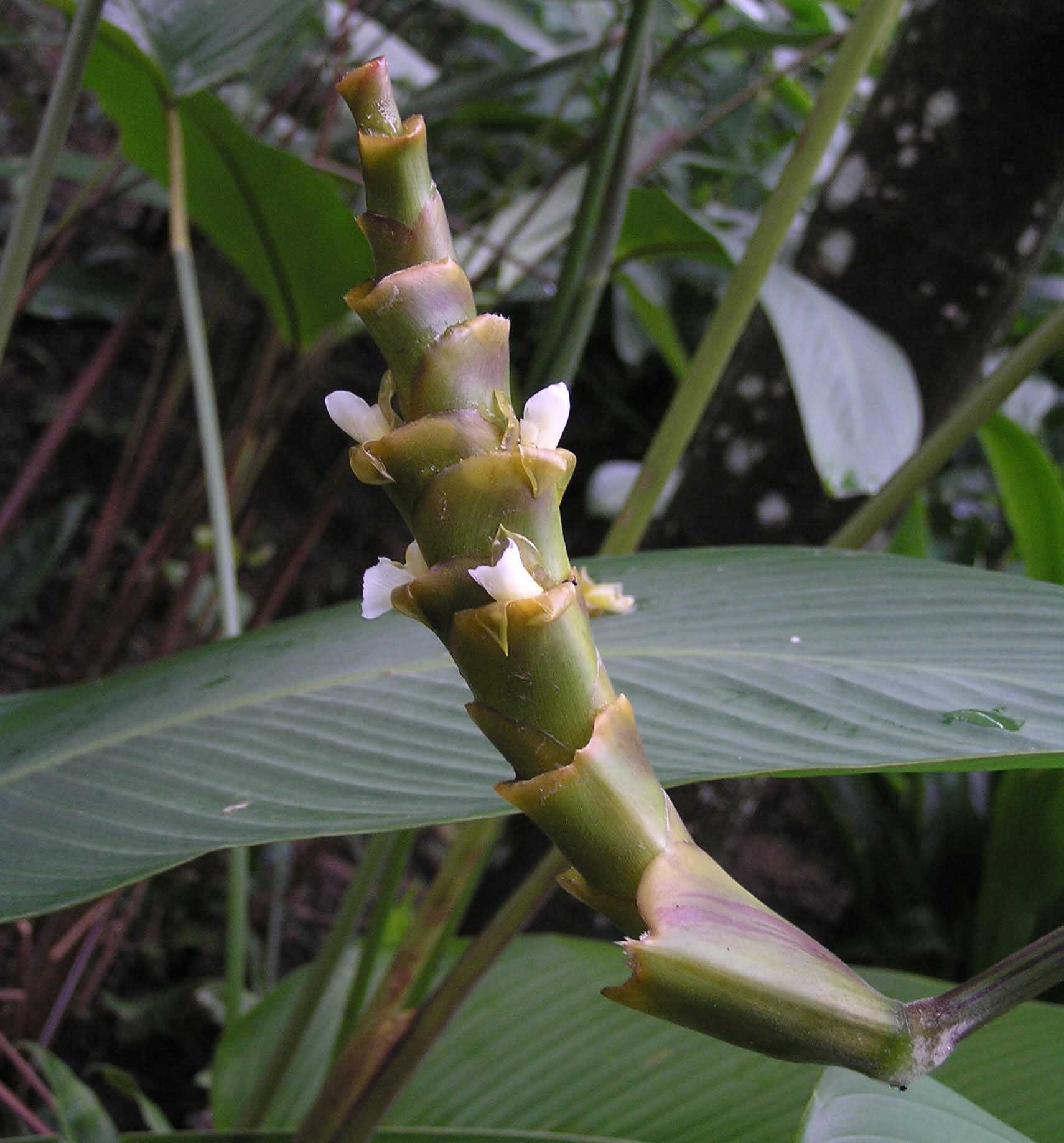
Orchidantha siamensis

As of August 2013, the World Checklist of Selected Plant Families accepted 17 species:

- Orchidantha borneensis N.E.Br. - Borneo
- Orchidantha chinensis T.L.Wu - Guangdong, Guangxi
- Orchidantha fimbriata Holttum - Pen. Malaysia
- Orchidantha foetida Jenjitt. & K.Larsen - Thailand
- Orchidantha grandiflora Mood & L.B.Pedersen - Sabah
- Orchidantha holttumii K.Larsen - Sabah, Brunei
- Orchidantha inouei Nagam. & S.Sakai - Sarawak
- Orchidantha insularis T.L.Wu - Hainan
- Orchidantha laotica K.Larsen - Laos
- Orchidantha longiflora (Scort.) Ridl. - Pen. Malaysia
- Orchidantha maxillarioides (Ridl.) K.Schum. - Pahang
- Orchidantha quadricolor L.B.Pedersen & A.L.Lamb - Sabah
- Orchidantha sabahensis A.L.Lamb & L.B.Pedersen - Sabah
- Orchidantha siamensis K.Larsen - Pen. Malaysia, S Thailand
- Orchidantha stercorea H.Ð.Trần & Škorničk. - Vietnam
- Orchidantha suratii L.B.Pedersen - Sabah
- Orchidantha vietnamica K.Larsen - Vietnam

== Bibliography ==
- Sass, C; Iles, WJ; Barrett, CF; Smith, SY; Specht, CD (21 January 2016). "Revisiting the Zingiberales: using multiplexed exon capture to resolve ancient and recent phylogenetic splits in a charismatic plant lineage". PeerJ. 4 e1584. doi:10.7717/peerj.1584. PMC 4727956. PMID 26819846.
