= Ginger-families =

Clade of flowering plants

The ginger-families or ginger group or Core Zingiberales is a terminal clade in the order Zingiberales (Monocotyledoneae) that comprises Zingiberaceae (the ginger family), Costaceae, Marantaceae and Cannaceae. Their shared synapomorphy of a single fertile anther and four or five highly modified staminodia differentiate them from the basal paraphyletic assemblage of the "banana-families".

Cladogram I: Phylogeny of Zingiberales

- Zingiberales
  - - Zingiberineae
    - - Heliconiaceae
      - Strelitziineae
  - Musaceae

They form a Suborder Zingiberineae Kress in taxonomic classification, with the following phylogeny, the four families being grouped into two superfamilies.

Cladogram II: Phylogeny of Suborder Zingiberineae (gingers)

- Zingiberineae
  - Zingiberariae
    - Zingiberaceae
    - Costaceae
  - Cannariae
    - Cannaceae
    - Marantaceae

== See also ==
- Banana-families
- Zingiberales
- Monocotyledoneae

== Bibliography ==
- Sass, C; Iles, WJ; Barrett, CF; Smith, SY; Specht, CD (21 January 2016). "Revisiting the Zingiberales: using multiplexed exon capture to resolve ancient and recent phylogenetic splits in a charismatic plant lineage". PeerJ. 4 e1584. doi:10.7717/peerj.1584. PMC 4727956. PMID 26819846.
