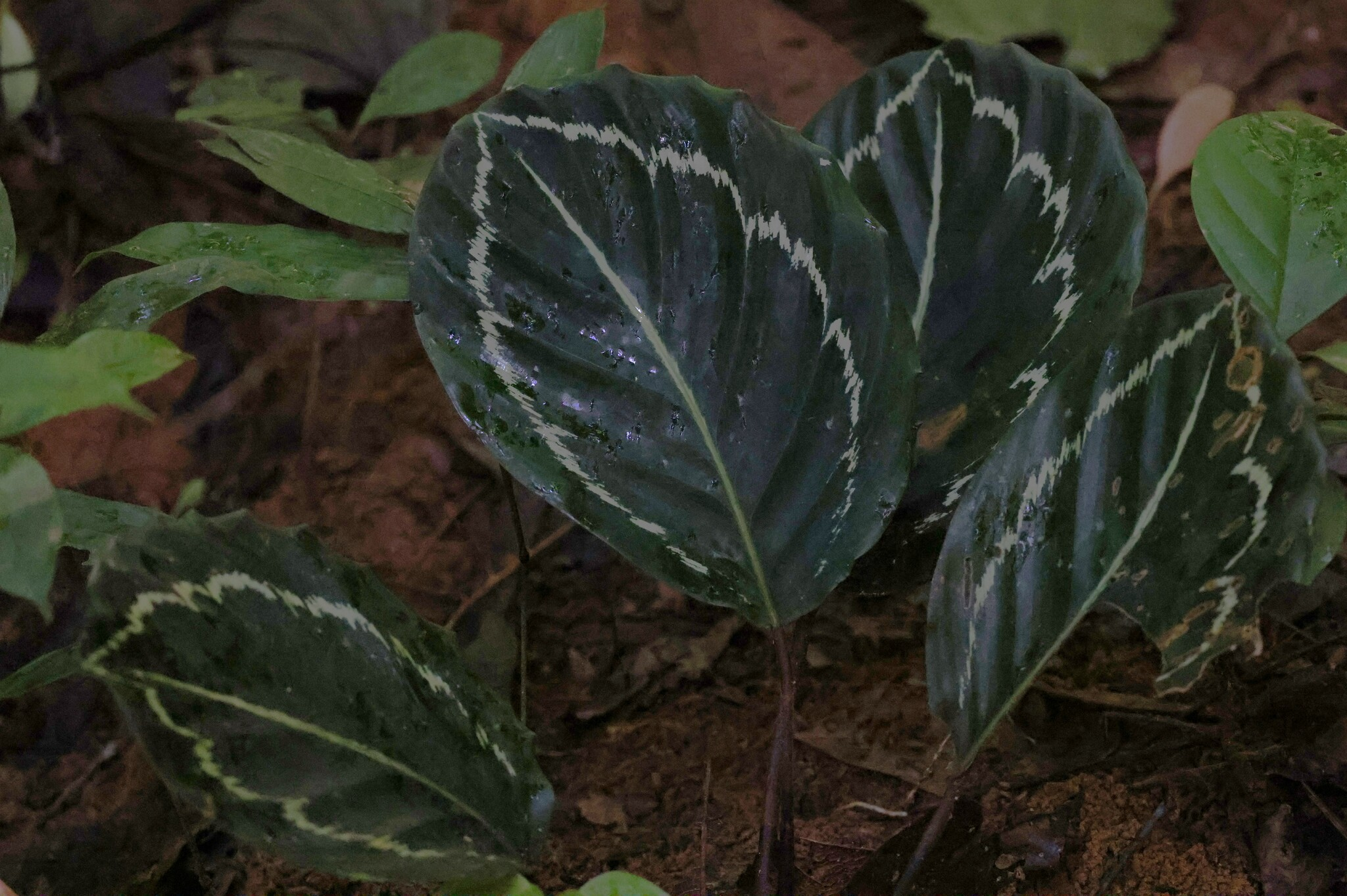

Scientific classification
- Kingdom: Plantae
- Clade: Embryophytes
- Clade: Tracheophytes
- Clade: Spermatophytes
- Clade: Angiosperms
- Clade: Monocots
- Clade: Commelinids
- Order: Zingiberales
- Family: Marantaceae
- Genus: Goeppertia
- Species: G. roseopicta

Binomial name
- Goeppertia roseopicta (Linden ex Lem.) Borchs. & S.Suárez

Synonyms
- Calathea illustris (Linden) N.E.Br.; Maranta illustris Linden; Maranta roseopicta Linden; Maranta wagneri Veitch ex Regel; Phyllodes roseopicta (Linden) Kuntze; Calathea roseopicta (Linden) Regel

= Goeppertia roseopicta =

Species of flowering plant

Goeppertia roseopicta is a species of flowering plant in the arrowroot and prayer-plant family Marantaceae, native to northwestern Brazil's Amazonian basin. It is marketed as a houseplant under its former name and synonym

== Description ==
Calathea roseopicta. It is a clump-forming, evergreen perennial, growing to 50 cm (20 in), and is very similar in appearance to G. makoyana. The typical "wild-type", or "natural" form, has papery, ovate leaves of a pastel, seafoam-green hue, outlined with a dark-green edging and "painted" horizontally from the midribs with darker streaks; typical of other species in its family and genus, G. roseopicta features dark reddish, purplish backsides to its foliage, an evolutionary adaptation to growing in darkened or shaded areas on the forest floor, where adequate light reflection is required for photosynthesis.

== Cultivation ==
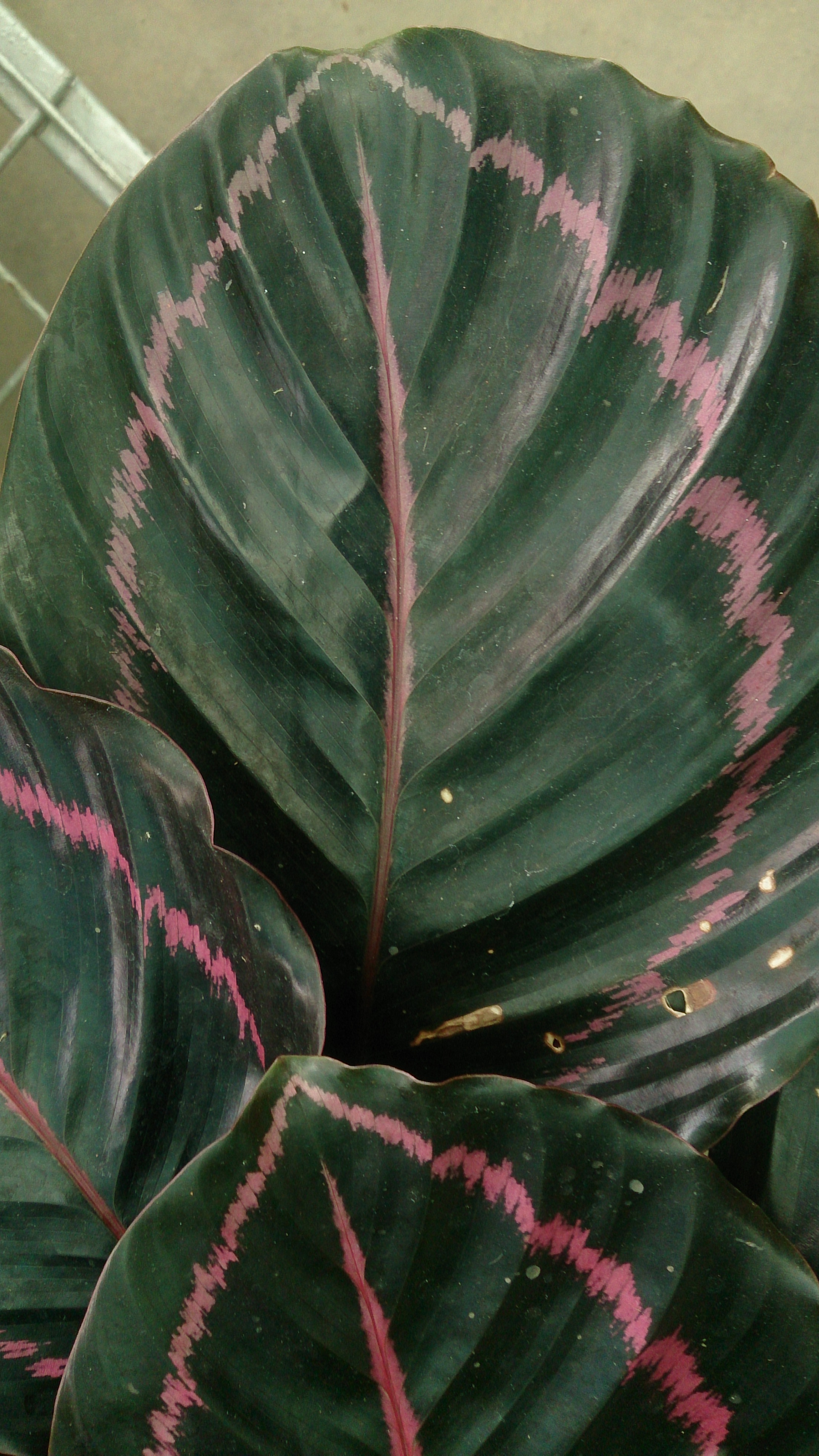
Cultivar "Dottie"

Certain cultivars available in the plant trade often feature very dark-green to blackish or purple-mauve leaves with a range of pinks, reds and whites, often with little to no green tones. Common varietals include Goeppertia roseopicta 'Dottie', 'Rosy', among others.

== Care ==
G. roseopicta is tender, with a minimum temperature of 16 °C (61 °F) required, and in temperate areas is cultivated indoors as a houseplant. It requires a constant temperature of 18–24 °C (64–75 °F), high humidity levels at all times, and bright indirect light. This plant has gained the Royal Horticultural Society's Award of Garden Merit as a houseplant.

== Uses ==
Bora people use the plant medicinally.
