= Prayer plant =

Prayer plant may refer to:

- Marantaceae, commonly called "prayer plants", since their leaves raise at the evening and look as if they're praying
  - Calathea, a genus of the above family that are called "prayer plants"
  - Goeppertia, a genus where many species of Calathea have been reassigned
  - Maranta leuconeura, a popular houseplant species in this family
