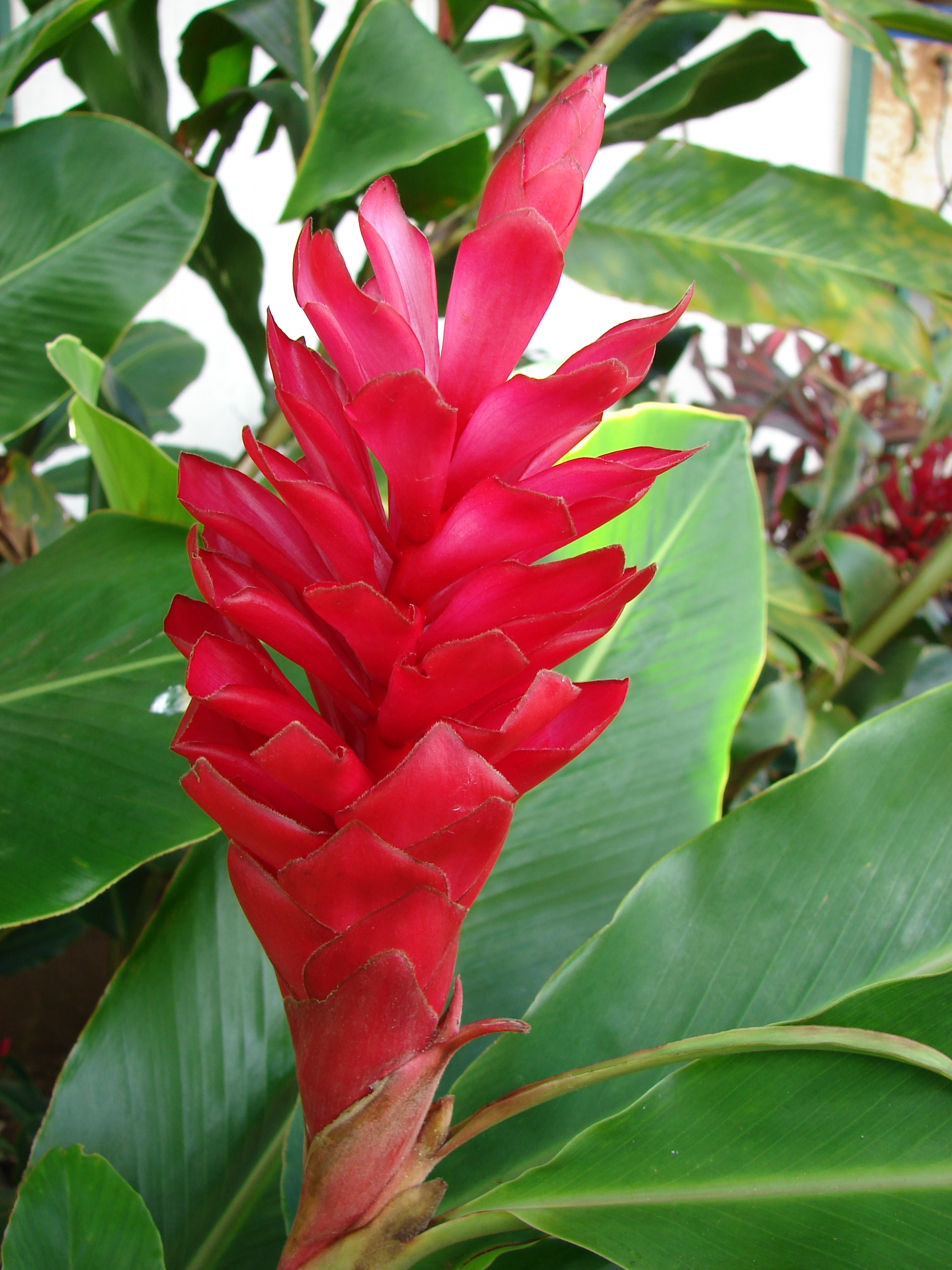
- Alpinia purpurata (Zingiberaceae)

Scientific classification
- Kingdom: Plantae
- Clade: Embryophytes
- Clade: Tracheophytes
- Clade: Angiosperms
- Clade: Monocots
- Clade: Commelinids
- Order: Zingiberales; Griseb.

Type genus
- Zingiber Mill.

Families
- List: Cannaceae Juss.; Costaceae Nakai; Heliconiaceae Vines; Lowiaceae Ridl.; Marantaceae R.Br.; Musaceae Juss.; Strelitziaceae Hutch.; Zingiberaceae Martinov

Diversity
- 99 genera

Synonyms
- Amomales Lindl.; Cannales R.Br. ex Bercht. et J.Presl; Lowiales Takht. ex. Reveal & Doweld; Scitamineae; Zingiberanae Takht. ex Reveal; Zingiberidae Cronquist; Zingiberides; Zingiberiflorae

= Zingiberales =

Zingiberales Temporal range: 80–0 Ma Late Cretaceous – Recent

Order of flowering plants

- Floral formula
- B X–$ ☿ P3+3 A3+3(1-6) G̅(3); Bracteate, Zygomorphic-Asymmetric, Bisexual; Perianth: 6 tepals in 2 whorls of 3 Stamens: 2 whorls of 3 frequently modified to 1–6; Ovary: Inferior - 3 fused carpels

The Zingiberales are flowering plants forming one of four orders in the commelinids clade of monocots, together with its sister order, Commelinales. The order includes 68 genera and 2,600 species. Zingiberales are a unique though morphologically diverse order that has been widely recognised as such over a long period of time. They are usually large herbaceous plants with rhizomatous root systems and lacking an aerial stem except when flowering. Flowers are usually large and showy, and the stamens are often modified (staminodes) to also form colourful petal-like structures that attract pollinators.

Zingiberales contain eight families that are informally considered as two groups, differing in the number of fertile stamens. A "banana group" of four families appeared first and were named on the basis of large banana-like leaves. Later, a more genetically coherent (monophyletic) "ginger group" appeared, consisting of the remaining four families. The order, which has a fossil record, is thought to have originated in the Early Cretaceous period between 80 and 120 million years ago (Mya), most likely in Australia, and diverged relatively rapidly with the families as they are known today established by the end of the period (66 Mya). Zingiberales are found throughout the tropics (pantropical) with some extension into subtropical and temperate climates. They rely on insects for pollination, together with some birds and small animals.

The order includes many familiar plants, and are used as ornamental plants (Bird of Paradise flower, heliconias, prayer-plants), food crops (bananas, plantains, arrowroot), spices and traditional medicines (ginger, cardamom, turmeric, galangal, fingerroot and myoga).

== Description ==
Zingiberales are one of an ecologically and morphologically diverse and species-rich order of monocots, with one of the most distinct floral morphology. They are large rhizomatous herbaceous plants but lacking an aerial stem, except when flowering.

Leaves usually petiolate with distinct petiole and lamina, leaf arrangement distichous (spiral in Musaceae). Venation pinnate-parallelodromous, with midrib (midvein), S-shaped lateral veins and fine transverse venation.

Flowers are generally large and showy, following the general monocot pattern, with inflorescences in thyrse-like spikes, zygomorphic to asymmetric, with two trimerous whorls of tepals. Gynoecium tricarpellate, ovary epigynous (inferior), two trimerous androecial whorls with stamens 6, 5 or 1. Stamens have elongated sterile filaments to which are attached anthers, distally, comprising about half of the length of the total stamen. Septal nectaries often present. Pollen sulcate but often inaperturate (lacking apertures).

Fruit capsular or schizocarp. Phytochemistry: Often containing raphides,

Specific characteristics which help to distinguish this order include a herbaceous arborescent stem, distichous phyllotaxy, large petiolate leaves in which the petioles are often long, parallel and transverse venation diverging laterally from a prominent common midrib, and inflorescences of conspicuous colorful bracts (bracteate inflorescence) and the substitution of one to five rudimentary staminodia for fertile stamens.

Leaf architecture is useful for distinguishing families within Zingiberales, based on vein pattern type, vein length per area, and other aspects of vein architecture such as angle of vein divergence, with three main types of venation recognised. These are the Zingiber-type, with square to vertically elongate areoles, the Costus-type, with horizontally elongate areoles and the Orchidantha-type with cross veins spanning multiple parallel veins.

=== Apomorphies ===
The apomorphies (derived characteristics common to a taxonomic group) are considered to be specialised isomorphic root hair cells, penni-parallel leaf venation, supervolute ptyxis (left and right halves of immature leaf lamina rolled into each other), diaphragmed air chambers in leaves and stem, presence of intracellular silica bodies, epigynous flowers and an inferior ovary, pollen grains without distinctive aperture but with a reduced exine layer and an elaborated intine layer, nuclear endosperm development, and arillate seeds.

== Taxonomy ==
"The Zingiberiflorae, whether treated as a separate superorder, as here, or an order in a more widely circumscribed unit, is one of the most indisputably natural suprafamilial groups."

=== History ===
The Zingiberales have always been considered a unique and coherent (monophyletic) group, although accounting for <4% of extant monocots, which has led some authors to suggest they should constitute a higher taxonomic rank than order. For a brief history of the taxonomy of this order, see Scitamineae, and Kress 1990. They were first described by August Grisebach, their botanical authority, in 1854 as Zingiberides, an order of monocotyledons, subdivided into two families, Scitamineae and Musaceae.

Based on morphological grounds alone, early systems, such as Bentham and Hooker (1883) placed the Scitamineae as an Ordo (family) of the Epigynae alliance in the monocotyledons, incorporating both of Grisebach's families. Later systems such as the Engler system (1903) and the Wettstein system (1924), also considered Scitamineae as a monocotyledon order and were influential for a long period of time. Variants included Scitaminales (Warming 1912). Hutchinson (1926), although initially using Scitamineae, later followed Takenoshin Nakai (1930). in adopting Zingiberales as the name for the order (6 families) in Division Calyciferae, although credit is generally given to Nakai. This usage was followed by Takhtajan (1966) within superorder Lilianae and by Dahlgren (1985) in its own superorder Zingiberiflorae.

In contrast the Cronquist system retained Scitamineae as the name for this order with eight families, but organised the order in the subclass Zingiberidae of the class Liliopsida (monocotyledons).

=== Modern era ===
Using molecular phylogenetics, which was first applied to the order in 1993, the Angiosperm Phylogeny Group (APG) system (1998), (which generally followed Dahlgren, but with fewer divisions) confirmed the position of Zingiberales as a monophyletic order within the monocots, placing it in the commelinoid clade, as sister group to Commelinales, which Dahlgren had treated within a separate superorder. This was an ordinal system that did not examine subordinal structure. The 2003 revision (APG II) changed commelinoid to commelinid, but not the relationships, and this remained unchanged in the subsequent 2009 APG III system and 2016 APG IV system without addressing interfamilial relationships.

clade monocots :
- clade commelinids:

- order Arecales (palms)
- order Commelinales (spiderwort, water hyacinth)
- order Poales (grasses, rushes, bromeliads)
- order Zingiberales Griseb.(gingers, banana)

Cladogram: Phylogeny of the commelinids (APG IV)

- commelinids
  - Arecales
  - Poales
  - - - Zingiberales
      - Commelinales

=== Subdivision ===
The order, which now has more than 2,600 species, distributed in 68 genera over eight families, has been subdivided from early times. In the Bentham & Hooker system (1883), their Ordo Scitamineae had four tribes: Zingibereae, Maranteae, Canneae, and Museae. These have become progressively divided to form the modern phyletic classification into the following monophyletic families: Zingiberaceae (gingers), Musaceae (bananas), Heliconiaceae (heliconias), Strelitziaceae (bird-of-paradise), Costaceae (spiral gingers), Cannaceae (canna lilies), Marantaceae (prayer plants), and Lowiaceae (Orchidantha). The APG II system (2003) provided a classification of families for the first time, retaining Kress's eight families.

Families (genera/species)

- order Zingiberales Griseb.
  - family Cannaceae Juss. (1/10 Canna cannas)
  - family Costaceae Nakai (7/143 e.g. Costus spiral gingers)
  - family Heliconiaceae Vines (1/194 Heliconia heliconias)
  - family Lowiaceae Ridl. (1/18 Orchidantha)
  - family Marantaceae R.Br. (29/570 e.g. Maranta prayer plants)
  - family Musaceae Juss. (3/91 e.g. Musa bananas)
  - family Strelitziaceae Hutch. (3/7 e.g. Strelitzia birds of paradise)
  - family Zingiberaceae Martinov (50/1,600 e.g. Zingiber gingers)
Families of Zingiberales

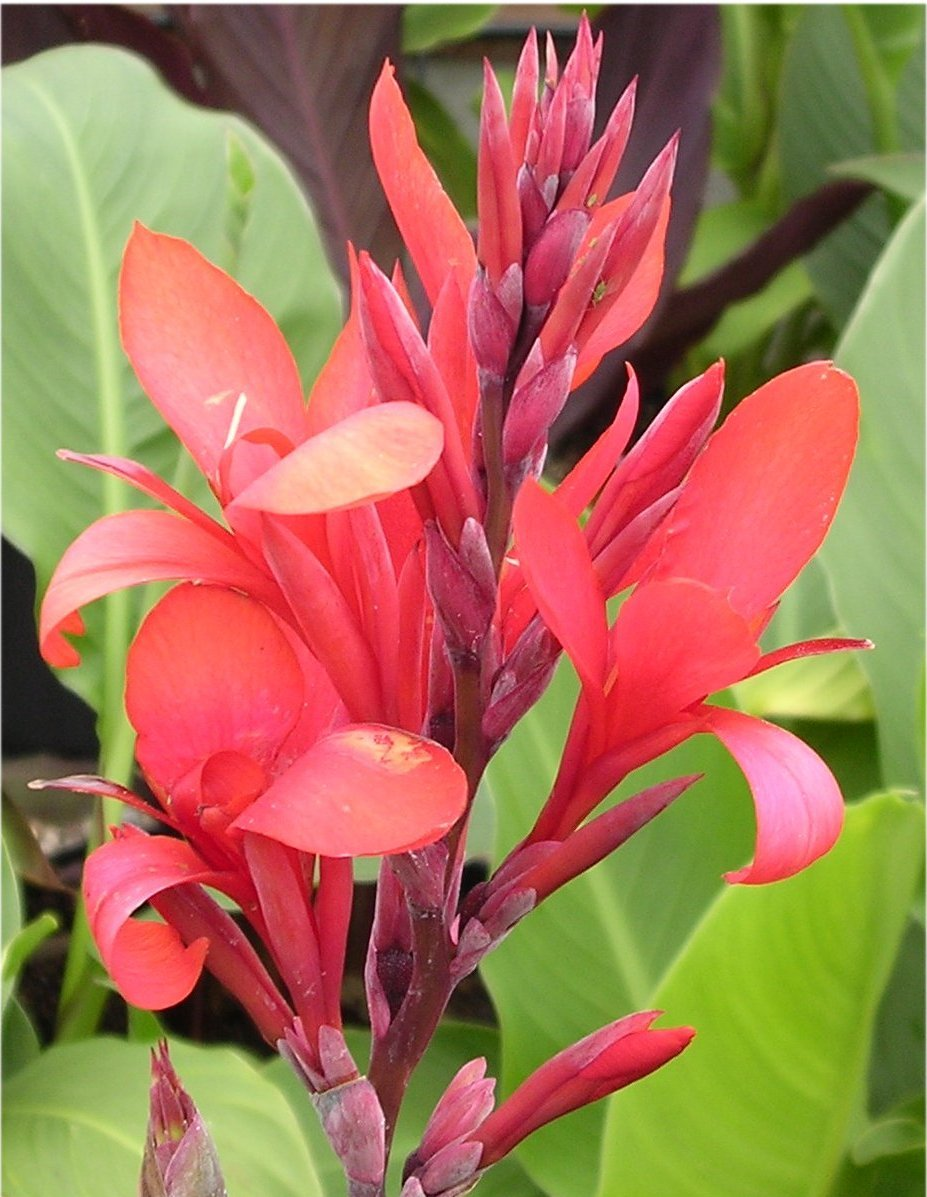
Canna coccinea
(Cannaceae)

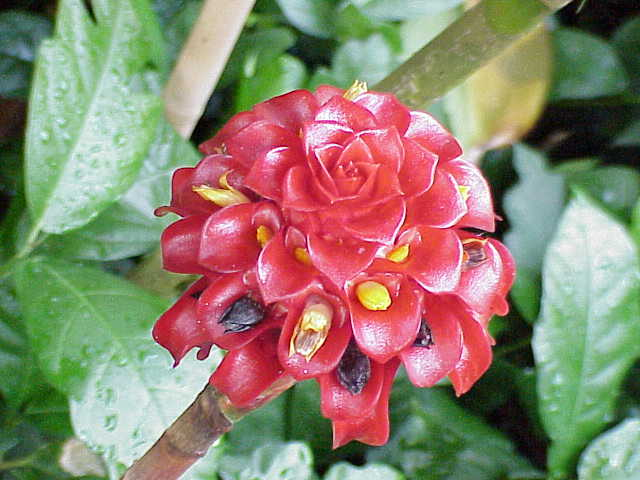
Tapeinochilos ananassae
(Costaceae)

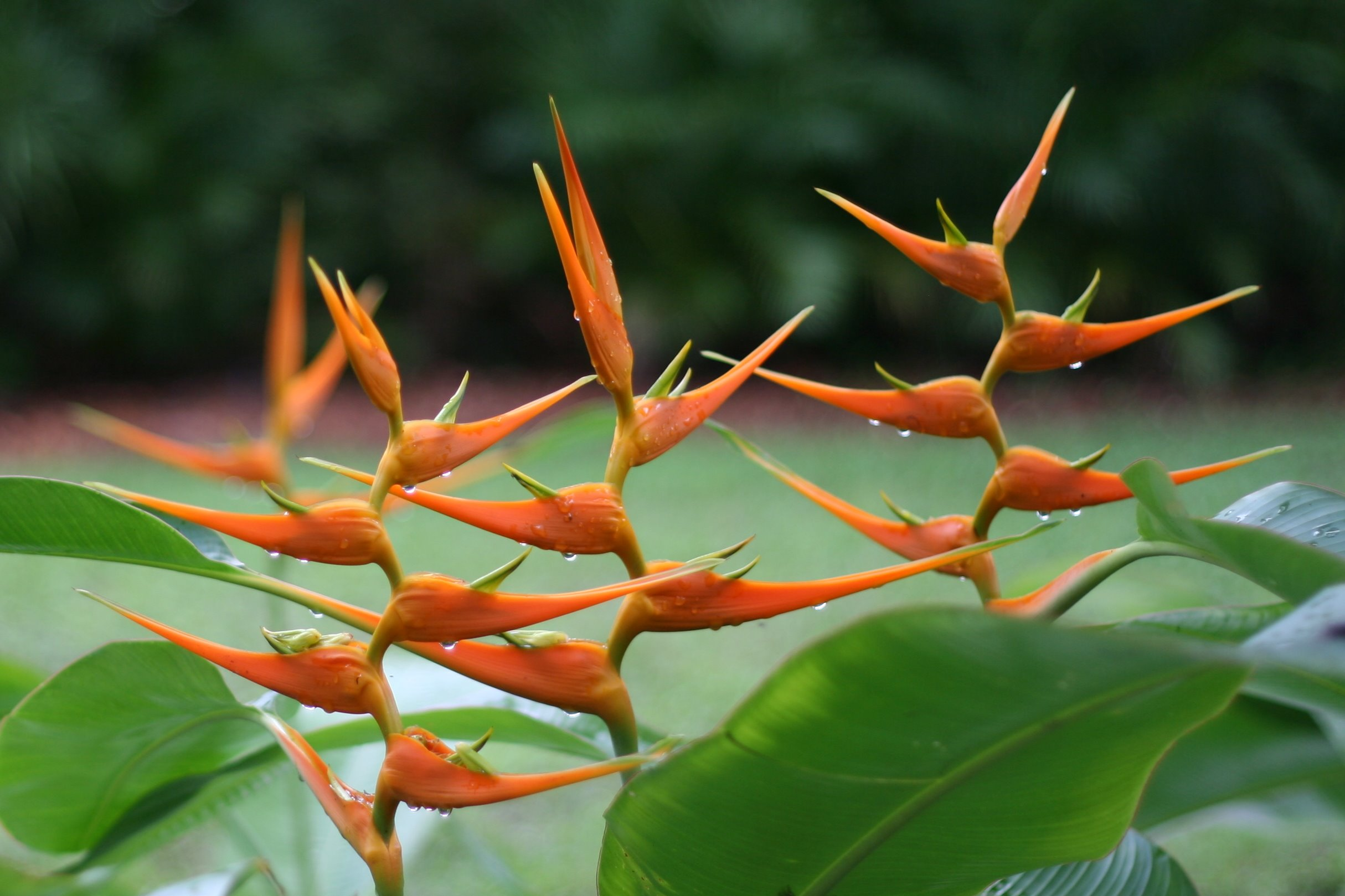
Heliconia latispatha
(Heliconiaceae)

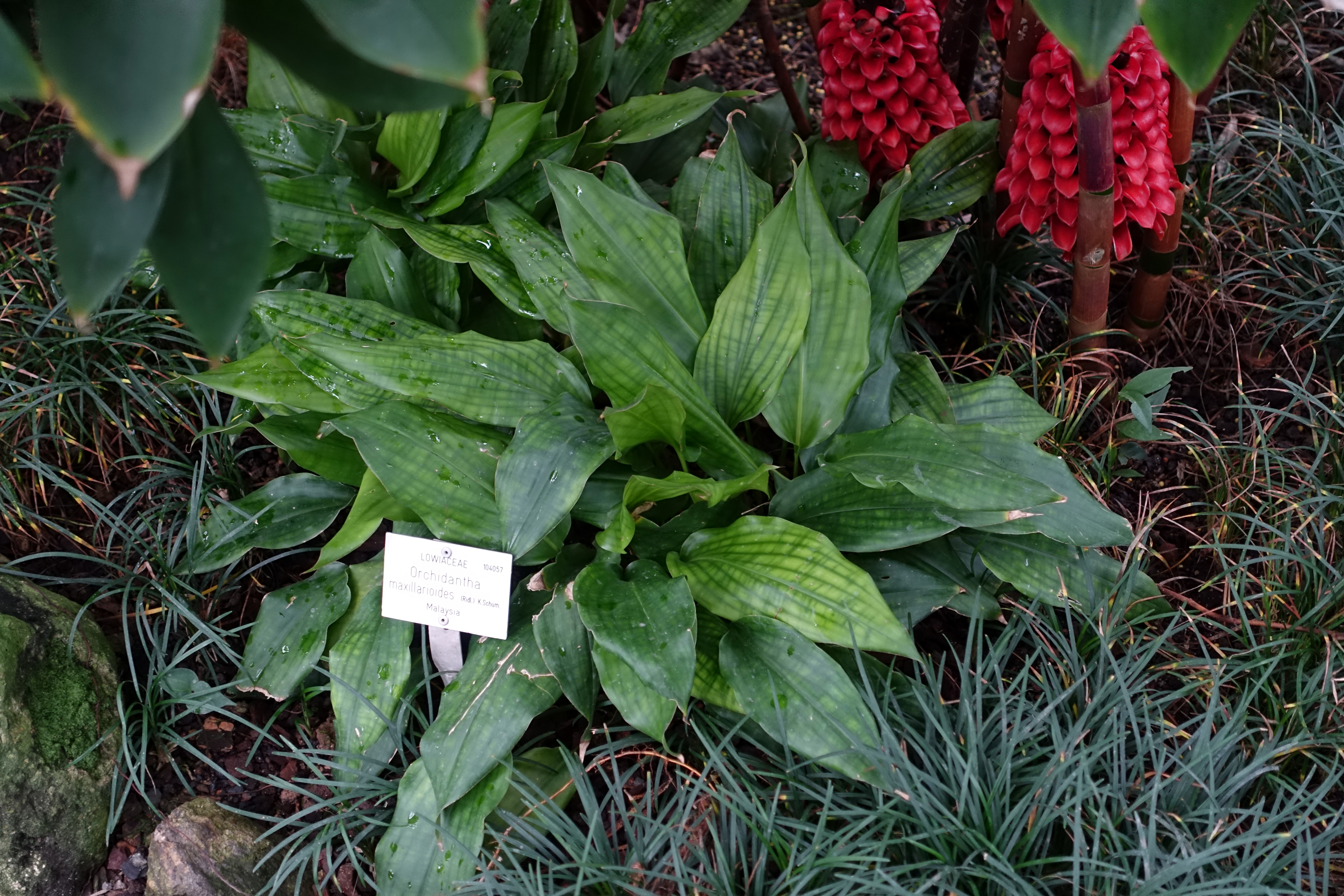
Orchidantha maxillarioides
(Lowiaceae)

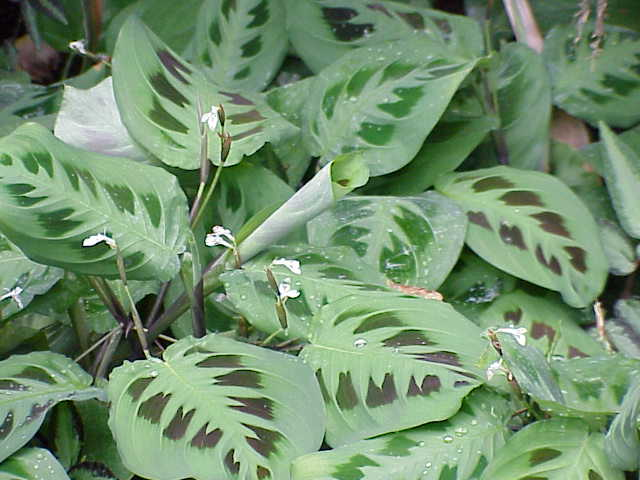
Maranta leuconeura
(Marantaceae)

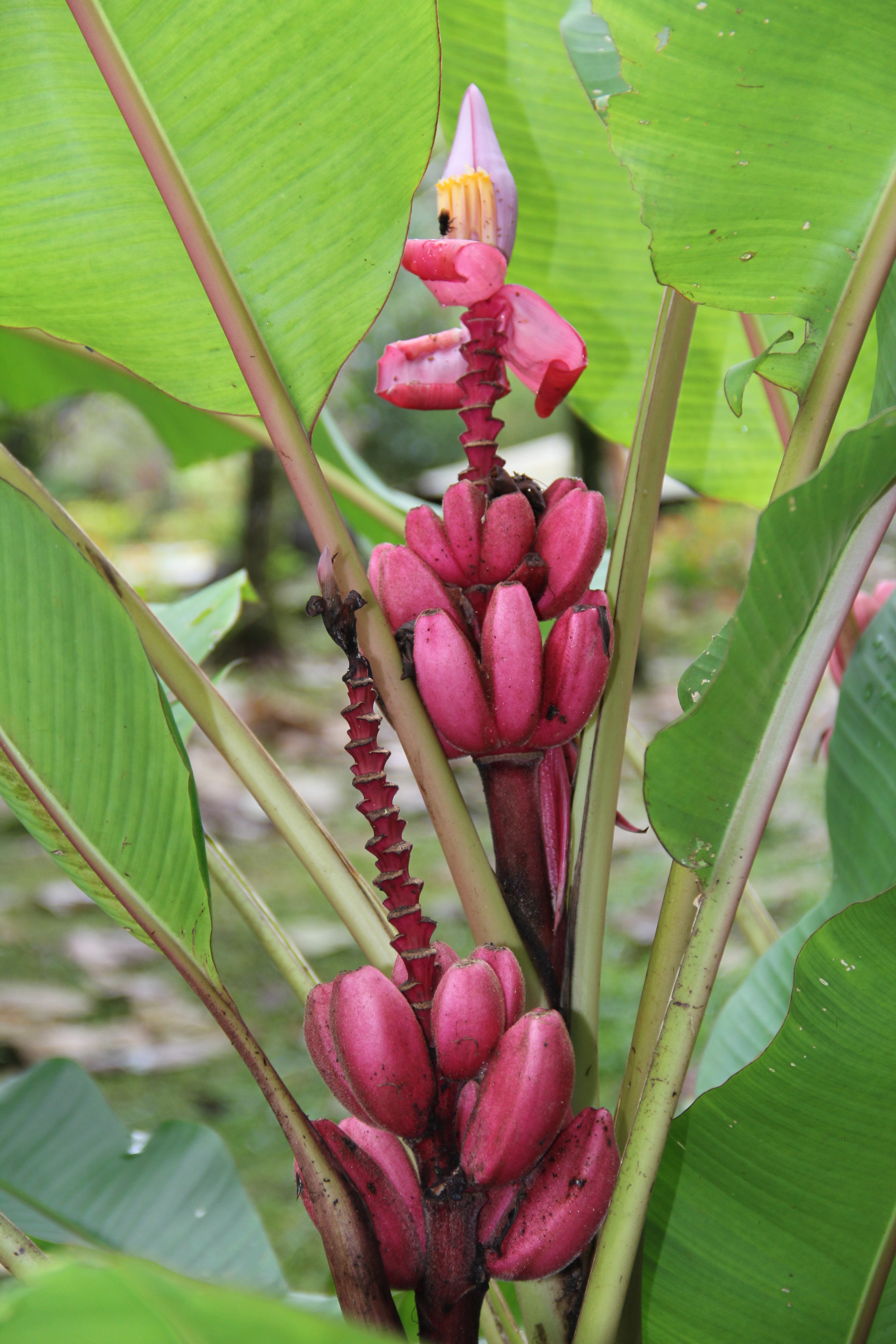
Musa rosea
(Musaceae)

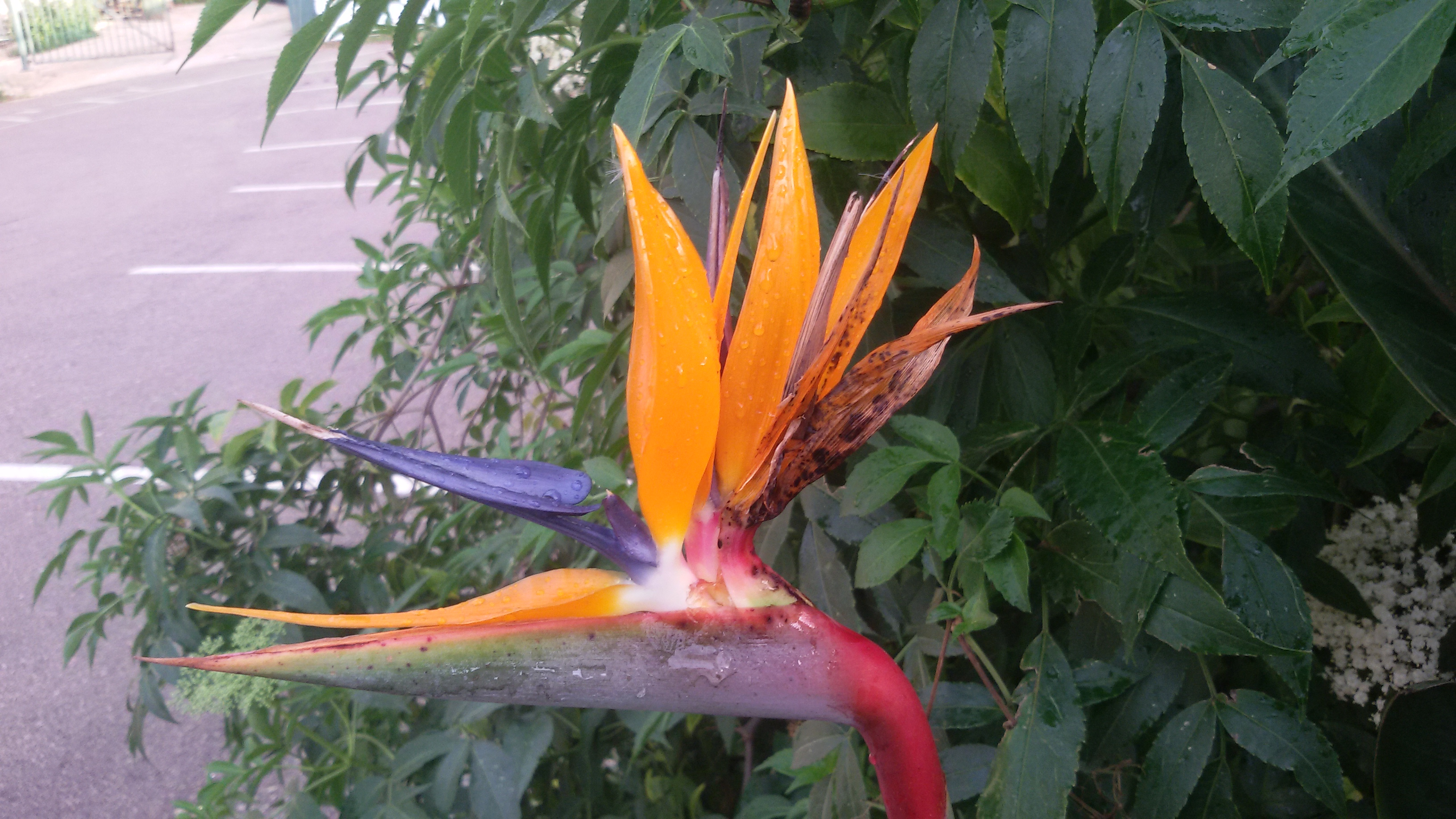
Strelitzia reginae
(Strelitziaceae)

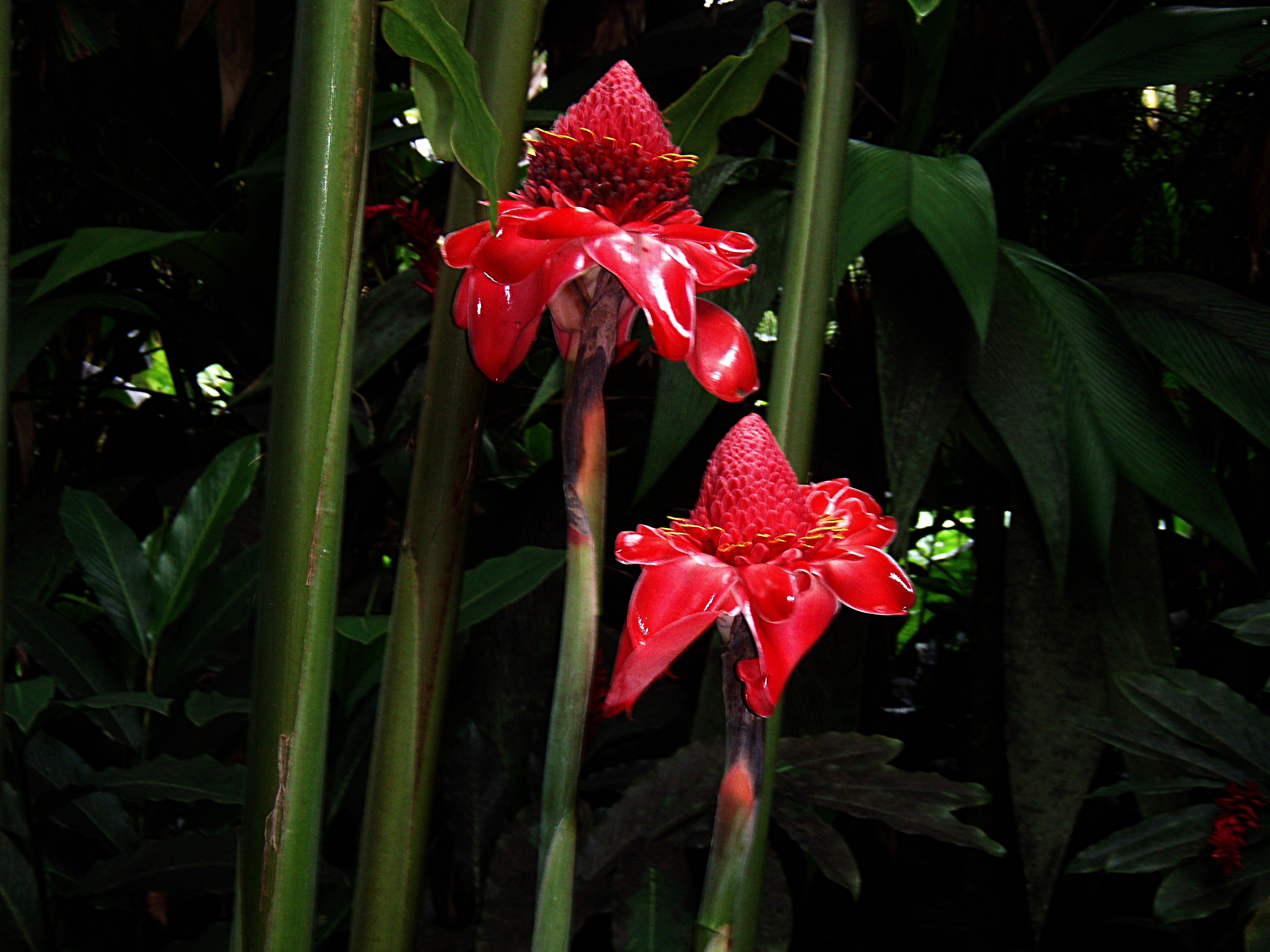
Etlingera elatior
(Zingiberaceae)

Based on morphology alone, the Zingiberales have been considered to form two main groups, each with four families, utilising the number of fertile stamens;

Banana-families

- Musaceae, Strelitziaceae, Lowiaceae, Heliconiaceae. A paraphyletic basal assemblage with 5 or (rarely) 6 fertile stamens at maturity, arranged in as trimerous inner and outer whorls. In those with five stamina, the sixth may regress and be absent (Strelitziaceae and Lowiaceae, some Musaceae) or develop as an infertile staminode (Heliconiaceae, some Musaceae). Petals and stamens are often fused at the base to form a floral tube. These are known as the banana-families or the bananas on the basis of large banana-like leaves. For this reason these four families were previously all included in Musaceae, but the exact relationship between them remains somewhat uncertain;

Ginger-families

- Zingiberaceae, Costaceae, Cannaceae, Marantaceae (the gingers). A monophyletic derived terminal clade with the number of fertile stamens reduced to one (Zingiberaceae, Costaceae) or to one half, with a single theca (Cannaceae, Marantaceae). The remaining components of the androecium develop as four or five elaborate petaloid staminodia, highly modified from sterile stamens. This group may have one (Cannaceae, Marantaceae) or two (Zingiberaceae, Costaceae) anther pollen sacs. The infertile stamina are homologous with the fertile stamina in the bananas and other monocots) but assume the structure and function of petals as pollinator attraction. This group demonstrate complex patterns of fusion among their floral organs including the staminodes. In Zingiberaceae and Costaceae the staminodes fuse to form a staminodial labellum which provides much of the floral display. In general the flowers of this group display higher degrees of organ fusion and specialisation.

==== Phylogeny ====
Using combined morphology and molecular data, Kress and colleagues (1993, 1995, 2001) confirmed the broad separation into two clades based on morphology alone, and produced an infraordinal structure. In this scheme, they divided the families of the order as follows, with the ginger group as one suborder, and the banana group divided amongst three separate suborders:

Suborder Zingiberineae Kress ("gingers"; 2 superfamilies)

- Superfamily Cannariae Kress
  - Cannaceae A.L. Jussieu
  - Marantaceae Petersen
- Superfamily Zingiberariae Kress
  - Costaceae Nakai
  - Zingiberaceae Lindley

Suborder Strelitziineae Kress

  - Lowiaceae Ridley
  - Strelitziaceae Hutchinson

Suborder Musineae Kress

  - Musaceae A.L. Jussieu

Suborder Heliconiineae Kress

  - Heliconiaceae Nakai

While the two sister family groups that constitute the Zingiberineae (Cladogram I) and also the basal Strelitziineae (Strelitziaceae-Lowiaceae) sister group (Cladogram II) were strongly supported, the position of Musaceae and Heliconiaceae were not. In the above model (Model 1), Musaceae appears as the first branching family, and Heliconiaceae placed as sister to the Zingiberineae (Cladogram III). Other studies placed these and the Strelitziaceae-Lowiaceae sister group in a trichotomy with the remaining families. While a revision of the first model (Model 2) placed Heliconiaceae as the first branching lineage with Musaceae in a sister relationship with Strelitziineae, which in turn was sister to Zingiberineae (Cladogram IV). A third model (Model 3) supports Musaceae as the basal group but places Heliconiaceae as sister to Strelitziineae (Cladogram V). The failure to resolve the ancient rapid divergences of this order with multi-gene phylogenies and plastid data has important implications for understanding the evolution of characteristics.

Cladogram I: Phylogeny of Suborder Zingiberineae (gingers)

- Zingiberineae
  - Zingiberariae
    - Zingiberaceae
    - Costaceae
  - Cannariae
    - Cannaceae
    - Marantaceae

Cladogram II: Phylogeny of Suborder Strelitziineae

- Strelitziineae
  - - Lowiaceae
    - Strelitziaceae

Cladogram III: Phylogeny of Zingiberales (Model 1)

- Zingiberales
  - - - Zingiberineae
      - Heliconiaceae
    - Strelitziineae
  - Musaceae

Dashed line -- indicates weak support

Cladogram IV: Phylogeny of Zingiberales (Model 2)

- Zingiberales
  - - Zingiberineae
    - - Musaceae
      - Strelitziineae
  - Heliconiaceae

Dashed line -- indicates weak support

Cladogram V: Phylogeny of Zingiberales (Model 3)

- Zingiberales
  - - Zingiberineae
    - - Heliconiaceae
      - Strelitziineae
  - Musaceae

Dashed line -- indicates weak support

Finally in 2016 Sass and colleagues, using multiplexed exon capture were able to resolve the entire phylogenetic tree with high support. This confirmed the place of Musaceae as sister to the remaining families, confirming Model 3.

Cladogram VI: Phylogeny of Zingiberales
(Final Model)

- Zingiberales
  - - - Zingiberineae
        - Zingiberariae
          - Zingiberaceae
          - Costaceae
        - Cannariae
          - Cannaceae
          - Marantaceae
      - - Strelitziineae
          - Lowiaceae
          - Strelitziaceae
        - Heliconiaceae
  - - Musaceae

=== Evolution ===
The common ancestor of the Zingiberales together with those of its sister order, the Commelinales, is estimated to have originated 158 Mya (million years ago) in the Early Cretaceous, with separation of the two orders between 80 and 124 Mya, and with rapid radiation into the major lineages in the mid Cretaceous ca. 60–100 Mya and six of the eight families established by the end of the Cretaceous, Estimates of crown group age (most recent common ancestor of the sampled species of the clade of interest) vary widely between 34 and 110 Mya, and may need revision in the light of developing knowledge of the topology of the order.

Fossil-calibrated molecular estimates suggest a date of 110 to 80 Mya for the diversification of primary lineages. If Musaceae is the stem family of the order, as seems likely this places the origin of Zingiberales ca. 124 Mya, with diversification occurring ca. 110 Mya in the middle Cretaceous. That origin (124 Mya) was congruent with the breakup of the southern land mass, Gondwana.

Probably the ancestral Zingiberales were distributed in tropical Gondwanal and encompassing present-day Americas, Africa, and Southeast Asia. Within this land mass, Australia seems the most likely ancestral area, with subsequent dispersals between Africa and neotropical America. Earlier studies had implied Southeast Asia as the origin. The current distribution of the Zingiberales seems to be a product of numerous secondary and tertiary dispersal events between the major tropical regions of the world.

Zingiberales demonstrate an evolutionary trend in the ontogeny of the perianth (sepals and petals). The appearance of a dimorphic perianth (in which petals and sepals differ in appearance) is variable throughout the commelinid monocots, with a transition from an undifferentiated monomorphic perianth to a dimorphic one occurring independently in the two sister orders, Commelinales and the Zingiberales. The evolution of floral morphology within Zingiberales demonstrates a marked correlation between the reduction of the number of fertile stamens, and increased petaloidy. The ancestral Zingiberales flower is thought to have had 5–6 fertile stamens, following which the staminode evolved in the lineage leading to Heliconiaceae+Zingiberineae, finally leading to 2–5 staminodia dominating the floral display.

The phylogenetic diversification and biogeographic dispersal of the Zingiberales was, in part, driven by the evolutionary radiation and diversification of their associated animal pollinators, which include bats, birds, non-flying mammals and insects. Six of the eight families of the Zingiberales contain taxa specialised for pollination by vertebrates, which appears to be the plesiomorphic state in the order. Of these six families two are exclusively vertebrate-pollinated (Strelitziaceae, Heliconiaceae). Pollination by insects also occurs in six families with one (Marantaceae) or possibly two (Lowiaceae) families predominantly specialised for insect visitors.

==== Fossil record ====
Seed and fruit fossils of the Zingiberales appear in the Santonian of the Late Cretaceous, ca. 85 Mya, and thought to represent Musaceae and Zingiberaceae, but the place of the oldest Zingiberales fossil, Spirematospermum with its distinctive seeds remains uncertain, but is most likely Zingiberaceae. The leaf fossil record for Zingiberales also extends back to the Late Cretaceous. Other fossil records include rhizomes and phytoliths.

=== Diversity and biogeography ===
The four families of the basal banana group exhibit less taxonomic diversity than the terminal ginger group. The three genera of Musaceae are distributed in tropical Asia and Africa, although fossil evidence reveals their presence in North America and Africa in the Tertiary, while the three genera of Strelitziaceae are allopatric (isolated from each other) being found in Madagascar, southern Africa and the Amazon Basin respectively and Lowiaceae occurs in Southeast Asia. The largest family in this group, the Heliconiaceae is primarily neotropical, but also occurs in the Pacific from Samoa to Sulawesi.

Of the four Zingiberineae (gingers) families, three (Zingiberaceae, Costaceae, Marantaceae) are pantropical. The fourth, Cannaceae is restricted to the New World, although widely cultivated. This suborder contains the two largest families (Zingiberaceae and Marantaceae) and the largest number of species.

== Distribution and habitat ==
Zingiberales are pantropical and occur predominantly in the wet tropical regions of Asia, Africa, and the Americas, occupying nearly all tropical wet lowlands or middle elevation forests as part of the understory flora. In addition five genera from three of the Zingiberineae families, including Canna extend into subtropical and temperate regions. Of the eight families, Heliconiaceae, Marantaceae, and Costaceae are predominantly neotropical and Zingiberaceae most prevalent in Southeast Asian wet understory habitats. These are mainly small to medium-sized herbaceous taxa or vines. While some herbaceous Zingiberaceae such as Alpinia boia can attain a height of ten metres, only one species is a true canopy plant (Ravenala madagascariensis – Strelitziaceae). The latter, a Madagascar endemic, has thick, palm-like trunks which push the fan-shaped crown of leaves up into the top layers of the forest. Some Zingiberales prefer a greater degree of light and are found in forest glades or margins, or in open secondary growth along streams and rivers.

The large family Zingiberaceae has a number of subfamilies, one of which, Zingiberoideae, has members that have adapted to Southeast Asia's monsoonal climates. They do so by becoming dormant in the dry season, which may last four to six months, shedding all above ground parts, existing only as underground fleshy underground rhizomes, some of which have starch rich tubers. With the onset of the wet season, they send up shoots and complete their life cycle during this time. Some taxa within Marantaceae, Costaceae, and Musaceae also occur in these habitats and have adapted in this way, but no Zingiberales occur in true desert regions.

In contrast some Zingiberales, including taxa from Marantaceae, Heliconiaceae, Cannaceae (e.g. Canna glauca) have adopted an aquatic habitat and are found along river margins, ponds, and swampy areas, with their rhizomes rooted underwater.

== Ecology ==
Zingiberales forms a major component of tropical and subtropical ecosystems. Many of these plants have formed specialised pollination relationships with mammals (e.g., bats and lemurs), birds and insects (e.g., bees, dung beetles, moths and butterflies) through alterations in floral form.

== Uses ==
Many Zingiberales are horticulturally important and grown as ornamental plants, e.g., Heliconia (false bird-of-paradise), Strelitzia (bird-of-paradise), Maranta (prayer plants) and Canna. Others are crop plants with culinary usage, e.g., Musa (bananas, plantains) and Zingiber (ginger). Zingiberales also include sources of traditional medicines and spices, e.g. Alpinieae such as Elettaria and Amomum (cardamom) and Curcuma (turmeric).

== See also ==
- Scitamineae

== Bibliography ==
=== Books, symposium and chapters ===
- Bentham, G.; Hooker, J.D. (1862–1883). Genera plantarum ad exemplaria imprimis in herbariis kewensibus servata definita (in Latin). London: L Reeve & Co.
- Byng, James W. (2014). The Flowering Plants Handbook: A practical guide to families and genera of the world. Plant Gateway Ltd. ISBN 978-0-9929993-1-5.
- Columbus, J. T.; Friar, E. A.; Porter, J. M.; Prince, L. M.; Simpson, M. G., eds. (2006). "Symposium issue: Monocots: comparative biology and evolution (excluding Poales). Proceedings of the Third International Conference on the Comparative Biology of the Monocotyledons, 31 Mar–4 Apr 2003". Aliso. 22 (1). ISSN 0065-6275.
- Dahlgren, R.M.; Clifford, H.T.; Yeo, P.F. (1985). The families of the monocotyledons. Berlin: Springer-Verlag. ISBN 978-3-642-64903-5.
- Engler, Adolf (1903) [1892]. Syllabus der Pflanzenfamilien: eine Übersicht über das gesamte Pflanzensystem mit Berücksichtigung der Medicinal- und Nutzpflanzen nebst einer Übersicht über die Florenreiche und Florengebiete der Erde zum Gebrauch bei Vorlesungen und Studien über specielle und medicinisch-pharmaceutische Botanik (3rd ed.). Berlin: Gebrüder Borntraeger Verlag.
- Friis, Henrik; Balslev, eds. (2005). Plant Diversity and Complexity Patterns: Local, Regional and Global Dimensions: Proceedings of an International Symposium Held at the Royal Danish Academy of Sciences and Letters in Copenhagen, Denmark, 25-28 May, 2003. Kgl. Danske Videnskabernes Selskab. ISBN 978-87-7304-304-2.
- Givnish, T.J.; Pires, J.C.; Graham, S.W.; McPherson, M.A.; Prince, L.M.; Patterson, T.B.; Rai, H.S.; Roalson, E.R.; Evans, T.M.; Hahn, W.J; Millam, K.C.; Meerow, A.W.; Molvray, M.; Kores, P.; O'Brien, H.E.; Kress, W.J.; Hall, J.; Sytsma, K.J. Phylogeny of the monocotyledons based on the highly informative plastid gene ndhF: evidence for widespread concerted convergence (PDF). pp. 28–51. Archived from the original (PDF) on 2014-01-16. In Columbus et al. (2006)
- Grisebach, August (1854). Grundriss der systematischen Botanik für akademische Vorlesungen entworfen (in German). Göttingen: Dieterichschen Buchhandlung. (Grundr. Syst. Bot.)
- Hutchinson, John (1926–1934). The families of flowering plants, arranged according to a new system based on their probable phylogeny. 2 vols (1st ed.). Macmillan. Volume 1: Monocotyledonae 1926, Volume 2:Dicotyledonae 1934.
- Kress, J.W. Phylogeny of the Zingiberanae: morphology and molecules. pp. 443–460., in Rudall et al (1995)
- Kress, W.J.; Specht, C.D. Between Cancer and Capricorn: Phylogeny, evolution and ecology of the primarily tropical Zingiberales (PDF). pp. 459–478. Archived from the original (PDF) on 2017-12-30., in Friis & Balslev (2005)
- Kubitzki, Klaus, ed. (1998). The families and genera of vascular plants. Vol. IV. Flowering Plants. Monocotyledons: Alismatanae and Commelinanae (except Gramineae). Berlin Heidelberg: Springer Science & Business Media. doi:10.1007/978-3-662-03531-3. ISBN 978-3-662-03531-3. S2CID 39472817.
- Nakai, Takenoshin (1930), Hisi-Syokubutu
- Nakai, Takenoshin (1941). "Notulae ad Plantas Asiae Orientalis (XVI)". Jap. J. Bot. 17: 189–203.
- Rudall, P.J.; Cribb, P.J.; Cutler, D.F.; Humphries, C.J., eds. (1995). Monocotyledons: systematics and evolution (Proceedings of the International Symposium on Monocotyledons: Systematics and Evolution, Kew 1993). Kew: Royal Botanic Gardens. ISBN 978-0-947643-85-0. Archived from the original on 2014-01-05.
- Simpson, Michael G. (2011). Plant Systematics. Academic Press. ISBN 978-0-08-051404-8.
- Soltis, D.E.; Soltis, P.S.; Endress, P.K.; Chase, M.W. (2005). Phylogeny and evolution of angiosperms. Sunderland, MA: Sinauer. ISBN 978-1-58834-201-0. (see also: Excerpts at Amazon
- Takhtajan, Armen Leonovich (1966). "Lilianae". Система и филогения цветкорых растений (Sistema i filogeniia tsvetkovykh rastenii) [Systema et Phylogemia Magnoliophytorum] (in Russian). trans. C Jeffrey, as Flowering plants: Origin and dispersal, Edinburgh : Oliver and Boyd, 1969. Moscow: Наука. p. 473. ISBN 978-0-05-001715-9.
- Warming, Eugenius (1912). Frøplanterne (Spermatofyter) (in Danish). Kjøbenhavn: Gyldendalske Boghandel Nordisk Forlag.
- Wettstein, Richard (1924). Handbuch der Systematischen Botanik 2 vols (3rd ed.). Archived from the original on 18 February 2015.

=== Articles ===
- Barrett, C. F.; Specht, C. D.; Leebens-Mack, J.; Stevenson, D. W.; Zomlefer, W. B.; Davis, J. I. (25 November 2013). "Resolving ancient radiations: can complete plastid gene sets elucidate deep relationships among the tropical gingers (Zingiberales)?". Annals of Botany. 113 (1): 119–133. doi:10.1093/aob/mct264. PMC 3864734. PMID 24280362.
- Barrett, Craig F.; Baker, William J.; Comer, Jason R.; Conran, John G.; Lahmeyer, Sean C.; Leebens-Mack, James H.; Li, Jeff; Lim, Gwynne S.; Mayfield-Jones, Dustin R.; Perez, Leticia; Medina, Jesus; Pires, J. Chris; Santos, Cristian; Wm. Stevenson, Dennis; Zomlefer, Wendy B.; Davis, Jerrold I. (January 2016). "Plastid genomes reveal support for deep phylogenetic relationships and extensive rate variation among palms and other commelinid monocots". New Phytologist. 209 (2): 855–870. doi:10.1111/nph.13617. PMID 26350789.
- Bartlett, Madelaine E.; Specht, Chelsea D. (July 2010). "Evidence for the involvement of GLOBOSA-like gene duplications and expression divergence in the evolution of floral morphology in the Zingiberales". New Phytologist. 187 (2): 521–541. doi:10.1111/j.1469-8137.2010.03279.x. PMID 20456055.
- Christenhusz, Maarten JM & Byng, J. W. (2016). "The number of known plants species in the world and its annual increase". Phytotaxa. 261 (3): 201–217. doi:10.11646/phytotaxa.261.3.1.
- Deng, Jiabin; Gao, Gang; Zhang, Yan; He, Fengmei; Luo, Xuqiang; Zhang, Fengtai; Liao, Xinrong; Ahmad, Khawaja Shafique; Yang, Ruiwu (June 2016). "Phylogenetic and ancestral area reconstruction of Zingiberales from plastid genomes". Biochemical Systematics and Ecology. 66: 123–128. doi:10.1016/j.bse.2016.03.013.
- Kirchoff, B. K.; Lagomarsino, L. P.; Newman, W. H.; Bartlett, M. E.; Specht, C. D. (5 February 2009). "Early floral development of Heliconia latispatha (Heliconiaceae), a key taxon for understanding the evolution of flower development in the Zingiberales". American Journal of Botany. 96 (3): 580–593. doi:10.3732/ajb.0800305. PMID 21628214.
- Kress, W. John (1990). "The Phylogeny and Classification of the Zingiberales". Annals of the Missouri Botanical Garden. 77 (4): 698–721. doi:10.2307/2399669. JSTOR 2399669.
- Kress, W. John; Prince, Linda M.; Hahn, William J.; Zimmer, Elizabeth A. (2001). "Unraveling the Evolutionary Radiation of the Families of the Zingiberales Using Morphological and Molecular Evidence". Syst. Biol. 50 (6): 926–944. doi:10.1080/106351501753462885. PMID 12116641. S2CID 24179401.
- Salvi, Amanda M.; Smith, Selena Y.; Benedict, John C.; Leong-Škorničková, Jana; Specht, Chelsea (27 July 2015). "Re-Examining Zingiberales Fossils Using Leaf Venation" (Abstract of oral presentation). Botany (15004).
- Sass, C; Iles, WJ; Barrett, CF; Smith, SY; Specht, CD (21 January 2016). "Revisiting the Zingiberales: using multiplexed exon capture to resolve ancient and recent phylogenetic splits in a charismatic plant lineage". PeerJ. 4 e1584. doi:10.7717/peerj.1584. PMC 4727956. PMID 26819846.
- Smith, James F.; Kress, W.John; Zimmer, Elizabeth A. (1993). "Phylogenetic analysis of the Zingiberales based on rbcL sequences". Annals of the Missouri Botanical Garden. 80 (3): 620–630. doi:10.2307/2399850. JSTOR 2399850.
- Specht, Chelsea D.; Yockteng, Roxana; Almeida, Ana Maria; Kirchoff, Bruce K.; Kress, W. John (18 December 2012). "Homoplasy, Pollination, and Emerging Complexity During the Evolution of Floral Development in the Tropical Gingers (Zingiberales)" (PDF). The Botanical Review. 78 (4): 440–462. doi:10.1007/s12229-012-9111-6. S2CID 15781695.
- Tomlinson, P. B. (1 January 1962). "Phylogeny of the Scitamineae - Morphological and Anatomical Considerations". Evolution. 16 (2): 192–213. doi:10.2307/2406197. JSTOR 2406197.
- Triplett, J. K.; Kirchoff, B. K. (1991). "Lamina architecture and anatomy in the Heliconiaceae and Musaceae (Zingiberales)" (PDF). Canadian Journal of Botany. 69 (4): 887–900. doi:10.1139/b91-115.

=== APG ===
- APG (1998). "An ordinal classification for the families of flowering plants". Annals of the Missouri Botanical Garden. 85 (4): 531–553. doi:10.2307/2992015. JSTOR 2992015.
- APG II (2003). "An Update of the Angiosperm Phylogeny Group Classification for the orders and families of flowering plants: APG II". Botanical Journal of the Linnean Society. 141 (4): 399–436. doi:10.1046/j.1095-8339.2003.t01-1-00158.x.
- APG III (2009). "An Update of the Angiosperm Phylogeny Group classification for the orders and families of flowering plants: APG III". Botanical Journal of the Linnean Society. 161 (2): 105–121. doi:10.1111/j.1095-8339.2009.00996.x. hdl:10654/18083.
- APG IV (2016). "An update of the Angiosperm Phylogeny Group classification for the orders and families of flowering plants: APG IV". Botanical Journal of the Linnean Society. 181 (1): 1–20. doi:10.1111/boj.12385.

=== Websites ===
- "Tropicos". Missouri Botanical Garden. 2015.
- "Zingiberales". Heliconia Society of Puerto Rico.
- Johansson, Jan Thomas (2013). "The phylogeny of angiosperms".
- Stephen, Mark (14 July 2015). "Zingiberales" (Graphic presentation). Prezi.
- Stevens, P.F. (2017) [2001]. "Angiosperm Phylogeny Website". Missouri Botanical Garden. (see also Angiosperm Phylogeny Website)
