= Alyssa LaRoche =

- Born: December 5, 1979 (age 45); Manchester, New Hampshire
- Occupation(s): Entrepreneur, Machinimaker, Fashion designer, Journalist, Scenographer, Author
- Website: Aimee Weber Studio Inc.

Alyssa LaRoche (born December 5, 1979, in Manchester, New Hampshire) is the owner of Aimee Weber Studio Inc., and the person in control of the Second Life Resident Aimee Weber, for which her company is named.

== Activities as Aimee Weber ==
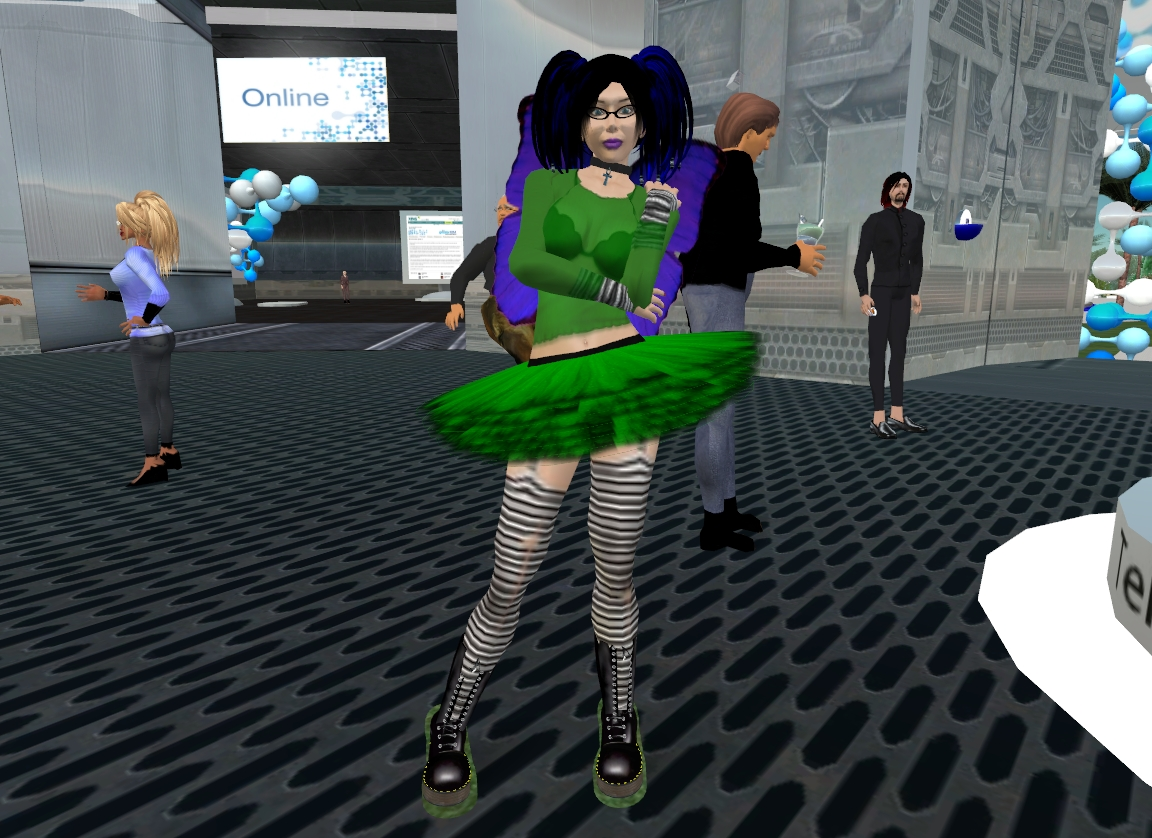
Aimee Weber, LaRoche's Second Life avatar, taken at an event held by IBM to celebrate the completion of their Second Life regions

LaRoche joined Second Life on January 30, 2004. Under the name Aimee Weber, LaRoche has guest-hosted, and been interviewed on the Second Life-centric podcast SecondCast. She produced what has been referred to as the first use of machinima for educational use when she produced a virtual tour of the Solar System. She was the lead author on Creating Your World: The Official Guide to Advanced Content Creation for Second Life. In November 2007, LaRoche was granted a trademark to "Aimee Weber".

Aimee Weber Studio Inc. has provided services for several real-world business, including the National Oceanic and Atmospheric Administration, United Nations, American Cancer Society, American Apparel, Warner Bros., NBC and Save the Children.

== *PREEN* ==
Prior to forming her company, LaRoche created the in-world fashion brand *PREEN*, described as a "punk ballerina" style. *PREEN* consists of 5 virtual locations with no physical stores currently.

== See also ==
- Resident (Second Life)
- Businesses and organizations in Second Life
- Anshe Chung
