= Cory Ondrejka =

American computer scientist

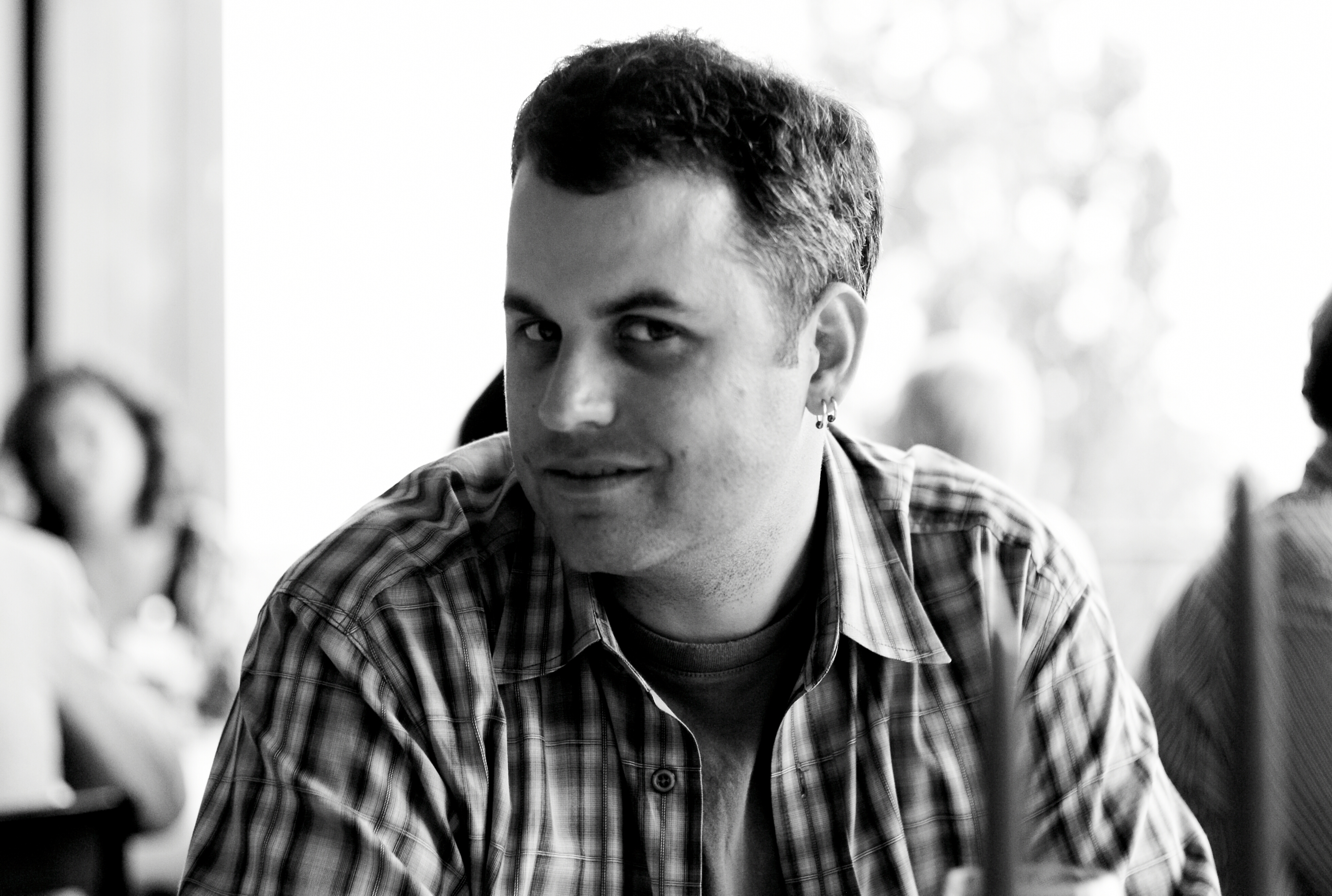
Cory Ondrejka

Cory Ondrejka is the former chief technology officer of Linden Lab, makers of Second Life. With Philip Rosedale, Ondrejka co-founded Second Life and played a significant role in the architecture of the product. After leaving Linden Lab, Ondrejka became Senior Vice President of Digital Strategy for the EMI Group until he left EMI in September 2009. He also was vice president of engineering at Facebook.

== Education ==
Ondrejka is a former US Navy officer and 1992 graduate of the US Naval Academy. He earned a joint undergraduate degree in Computer Science and Weapons and Systems Engineering, and has the distinction of being the first Annapolis graduate to do so. In 1995 he graduated with a master's degree in computer science from Boston University.

== Career ==
=== Before Linden Lab ===
Before joining Linden Lab, Ondrejka served as Project Leader and Lead Programmer for Pacific Coast Power and Light, where he helped to develop Road Rash 64 and built a core technology team to deliver titles to the Nintendo 64 and Sony PlayStation consoles. Prior to 2000, Ondrejka also worked for the Department of Defense and the National Security Agency.

=== Linden Lab (2000-2007) ===
Ondrejka joined San Francisco-based Linden Lab in 2000 and was the fourth employee retained by the company. During his tenure at Linden Lab (2000–2007), Ondrejka was chiefly responsible for the development of the Linden Scripting Language, and reportedly spearheaded Linden Lab's initiatives in favor of user intellectual property rights and open source code.

Ondrejka departed Linden Lab in 2007, a move initially rumoured in the virtual world blog Massively and subsequently confirmed in CNET and by numerous other sources following an official statement. Ondrejka's departure, which former Linden Lab Chief Executive Officer Philip Rosedale characterized in a BBC interview as amicable "differences... about how to run the company and how best we organise ourselves as a company going forward", was a source of controversy and speculation in the media and blogosphere.

=== After Linden Lab ===
In 2008, Ondrejka was recruited to join EMI with the title of senior vice-president of digital strategy. Digital business president Douglas Merrill commented on Ondrejka's appointment that, Ondrejka's experience in building virtual environments will be valuable to EMI in creating "new digital communities for fans and artists", specifically with a view to enabling people to find and engage with musical content.

In November 2010 Ondrejka was hired by Facebook, which also acquired the assets of a startup he cofounded in April 2010, Walletin. He got the title of engineering director. In 2011 he became the director of mobile engineering.

== In Second Life ==
Ondrejka was known in Second Life as "Cory Linden," and created an avatar to appear in the 3D world as the Flying Spaghetti Monster. His activities in the world were characterized by Wagner James Au as "puckish" and playfully anarchic, often to the benefit of newbies.
