= Wheelies (virtual nightclub) =

Virtual nightclub

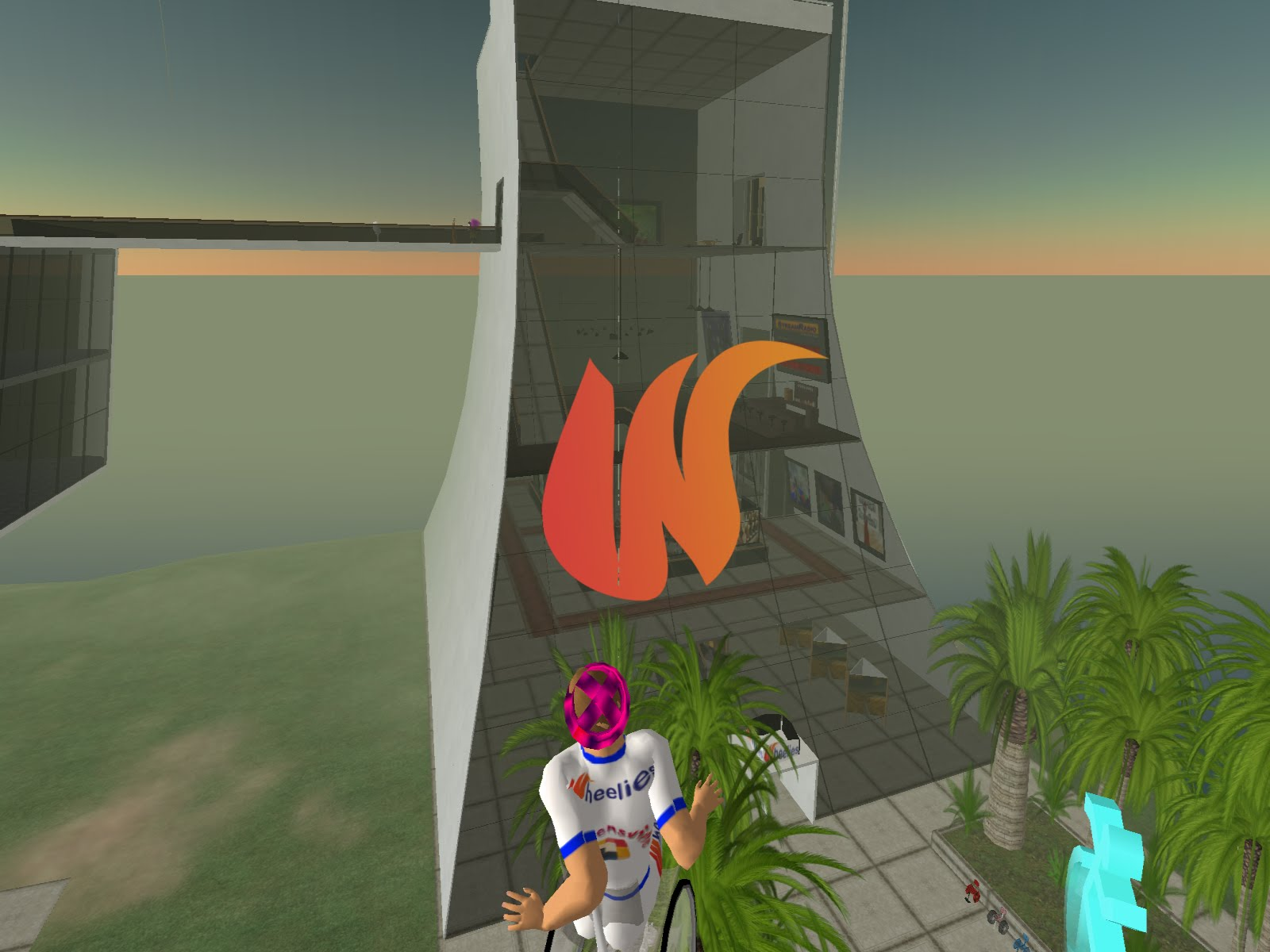
Wheelies Nightclub - May 2007

Wheelies is a disability themed virtual nightclub on the online platform Second Life. Created by Simon Stevens, it was awarded the Revolutionary Award in 2008 by Gordon Brown.

== History ==
Launched in September 2006, "Wheelies aims to make guests feel comfortable about disability as well as dancing, drinking and just plain having a good time." Destroyed in December that year by a griefing attack, it was relaunched in May 2007.

== The Revolutionary Award ==
The Revolutionary Award was awarded "for something that makes people in power more aware of the need for change" as part of the 2008 Community Awards for Social Technology (Catalyst). According to their website, Wheelies is "The world's first virtual disability nightclub. Based in Second Life, it is connecting disabled users and providing a platform for them to discuss common issues."

== Other recognition ==
Stevens has been interviewed about Wheelies on the CBC news. The transcript from this broadcast was featured in the second edition of the Pearson Longman book Open Book English Skills. Stevens was also interviewed by the British newspaper The Times and a Wheelies user was interviewed by the Australian site Web Usability. Wheelies has been discussed in a number of books, and in the BBC magazine along with a wider discussion of the use of Second Life by people with disabilities.
