= Ginko Financial =

Ginko Financial was a financial institution and alleged Ponzi scheme on the social networking video game Second Life. It offered accounts denominated in Linden Dollars, which would be paid extremely high interest rates (at one point 0.145% per day or 69.7% per year), ostensibly funded by undisclosed investments.

Many of the bank's investments were believed to be in in-game casinos. In 2007, after Linden Labs placed restrictions on in-world gambling, there was a run on the bank which caused it to collapse. All remaining accounts (by then worth 200 million Linden Dollars) were compulsorily converted into perpetual bonds.

After the collapse, Linden Labs introduced a rule that interest-paying accounts in Second Life could only be offered by organisations with real-life banking licenses.
