= Simon James Stevens =

British disability activist

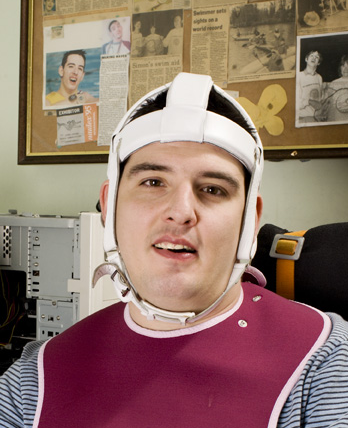
- Born: 20 April 1974 (age 52)
- Education: Coventry University
- Occupations: Activist and disability issues consultant
- Years active: 1998–present

Simon Stevens, also known as Simon Walsh in Secondlife, born 1974, is an English activist, Huffington Post blogger, and disability consultant known for his discussions on disability issues in the UK and on social media. Stevens formed Wheelies, a disability-friendly virtual nightclub within the 3D online community of Second Life. He is known as Simon Walsh and for his avatar's use of a wheelchair and helmet. Stevens was a prankster in the disability-themed hidden camera/prank show I'm Spazticus on UK's Channel 4 in 2012–2013. Stevens has received numerous awards and recognitions for his disability advocacy. He was the founder and chief executive of the disability consultancy firm Enable Enterprises from 1998–-2008. Stevens lives and works from Coventry, UK.

== Awards and recognition ==
Stevens received the Enterprising Young Brits award in 2004.

During the 2008 UK Catalyst Awards, Stevens was presented with the Revolutionary Award, by then UK Prime Minister Gordon Brown, on behalf of Wheelies, a disability-themed nightclub located in the online virtual world Second Life he had founded. The Catalyst Awards were held in honor of Britons who operate social technology projects for community benefit.

In 2013, Stevens was ranked 60th on the draft version of Disability News Service influence list, which, according to the DNS website, was meant to "highlight some of the many disabled people who make a difference in modern Britain". When the final version of "The List" was made available in 2014, Stevens was given an honorable mention ("fringes") under the category of "Equality/consultancy/access".

Stevens was featured as one of eight "disability rights activists changing the world for disabled people" by Able Magazine. He was also listed as one of ten people "most influential in the West Midlands from the world of social media" by Birmingham Mail in 2016.

== Disability and health ==
Stevens is affected by cerebral palsy, which, according to Stevens's site "affects my speech, mobility, hand control, balance and continence to a significant degree and provided me with a very good sense of humour." Additionally, Stevens has been diagnosed as having mild bipolar and in 2009, Stevens had a nerve virus which resulted in long-term acute neuropathy.

Stevens uses the spelling of disability as dysability (with a "y"), explaining:

The thing with difficulties is they can normally be overcome in one way or another through changes, adaptations and/or support. Therefore the term Dysability [sic] is not only a new term to describe people, but a new positive but realistic term for people to define themselves, as capable people with difficulties. I believe this different mindset compared to that of disability will have major consequences to how people see their relationship with society, from victim to interdependent partner.

== Second Life and Wheelies ==
In 2006, Stevens became the first user of Second Life to use a wheelchair as part of his avatar character. He later founded the virtual club Wheelies the world's first disability-themed virtual nightclub in Second Life, and "a friendly and inclusive place for disabled and non-disabled people from around the world to meet."

== Other work ==
Stevens claims to have worked with 149 companies, which are listed on his website. Stevens has written extensively about efforts in UK schools to integrate persons with disabilities into the mainstream educational system. This work around "integration" and his own integration experiences have been used to illustrate improvements in the UK's integration systems since the 1970s. Stevens has also been a national figure in "Go on Gold", a nationwide disability services campaign in the UK. Go on Gold "aims to enable disabled users to use the internet, smartphones and digital TV to improve their day-to-day lives, access services and jobs and interact with a world which may previously have been out of reach." Stevens has been a frequent guest blogger for the BBC website's disability blog "Ouch!" He has also written for Service User Voice. From January 2011 to April 2013, Stevens was a board member for Skills for Care as a service user.
