= Anshe Chung =

Virtual avatar

- May 1, 2006 cover of BusinessWeek magazine featuring Anshe Chung
- Born: Second Life
- Occupation: Virtual real estate broker
- Known for: First 'virtual millionaire'
- Website: anshechung.com

Anshe Chung is an avatar (online personality) of Ailin Graef in the online game Second Life. Referred to as the "Rockefeller of Second Life" by CNN, Graef built an online business that engages in development, brokerage, and arbitrage of virtual land, items, and currencies. Her work has been discussed in Business Week and Fortune.

== Background ==
Prior to founding the Second Life business that made her famous, Anshe Chung raised funds through event hosting, escorting, teaching and fashion design. According to Chung, she had already created fortunes in purely virtual currency on other MMORPGs such as Asheron's Call and Shadowbane, but had never converted that to real tender. This changed when she entered Second Life, where the in-game currency, "Linden Dollars" (L$), can be officially exchanged for real money.

After earning money from Second Life she was able to sponsor a boy named Geo from the Philippines through a German church organization.

== Business ==
According to Chung, in June 2004, she began selling and creating custom animations and then used this money to buy and develop virtual land. This is also considered the beginning of her business where, for the first time, she kept and reinvested funds instead of giving them away. As of 2006 Chung owned thousands of servers' worth of land, most of which were sold or rented to other users as a part of her 'Dreamland' areas. Within Dreamland, various levels of zoning rules are enforced; most other land in Second Life is unzoned, with multiple different types of business or housing located in adjacent areas. Philip Rosedale, the former CEO of Linden Lab – the company that produces Second Life – has referred to Anshe as "the government" when referring to the role she plays managing her regions.

According to Dr. James Cook of Linden Lab, "Anshe adds significant value to Second Life".

In February 2006, "Anshe Chung Studios, Ltd." was legally incorporated in Hubei, China

In November 2006, Chung announced that she had "become the first online personality to achieve a net worth exceeding one million US dollars from profits entirely earned inside a virtual world".

Meanwhile, Anshe Chung's business employs more than 80 people full-time, most of them programmers and artists. She counts several Fortune 100 companies among her clients as well as high-profile organizations such as the government of Baden-Wuerttemberg and LifeChurch.tv, whose Second Life entry her firm developed.

In January 2007, Anshe Chung Studios received venture capital investment from the Samwer brothers, who purchased a stake in the Anshe Chung Studios. In September 2007, the Gladwyne Partners, who had previously funded the Electric Sheep Company, also obtained stake in the Anshe Chung Studios.

Since 2006, the company has been active in IMVU, a 3D avatar chat. She has since been operating the largest currency exchange and content creation business for that platform, with about half of the 100 top selling products in IMVU originating from her company in Wuhan, while a considerable amount of the remaining top sellers are said to be coming from people who were originally trained in her company. During Anshe Chung's involvement with IMVU, that service's userbase has increased 50-fold, outgrowing Second Life in late 2007.

== Online investments ==
From 2005 until January 2009, Anshe Chung also owned a 30% share in Virtuatrade, a Pennsylvania-based company operating the site XStreetSL.com, a virtual goods trading site similar to eBay but specializing in Second Life items. The company was eventually sold to Linden Lab. XStreetSL has now become an integral part of Second Life called the "Second Life Marketplace".

In July 2008, a new portal site called AnsheX became available, operated by her company in Wuhan. The new site merges the services, communities and currency exchanges of several monetized virtual worlds, attempting to bridge the gaps between them.

According to several sources, including a title in the October 2009 issue of Avenue Magazine, Anshe Chung joined the founders of Skype as a key investor behind the 3D fashion games developer Frenzoo.

In 2010, Anshe Chung helped fund a new venture called the 3D Avatar School, which is using virtual world technology to create immersive language teaching environments.

In 2012, the 3D Avatar School won both the Red Herring Asia 100 and Red Herring Global 100 awards, while Frenzoo landed a hit on Android and iOS with the world's first 3D dress-up game, Style Me Girl.

By early 2014, Anshe Chung Limited had acquired an investment portfolio with several additional Internet and technology startups including Sellfy, Beyond Games, Makibox, IMVUCE, and ArtsCraft Entertainment, developer of MMORPG game Crowfall.

== Target of griefing ==
In December 2006, while conducting an interview for CNET with Daniel Terdiman on her economic assets, the virtual studio in which the interview took place was bombarded by flying animated penises. The griefers managed to disrupt the interview sufficiently that Chung was forced to move to another location and ultimately crashed the simulator entirely. Video and images of the incident were posted on the website Something Awful, and the incident received notice in some blogs and online news sites.

This attack in Second Life later became a template for a real life flying penis attack on chess world champion and Russian presidential candidate Garry Kasparov.

== See also ==
- Resident (Second Life)
- Linden Lab
- There (Internet service)
- IMVU
- Twinity
- Jon Jacobs (actor)
