= Second Life =

2003 online virtual world platform

Second Life Viewer
- Developer: Linden Lab
- Release: June 23, 2003; 23 years ago
- Written in: C++
- Engine: Open-source (C++, OpenGL)
- Platform: Windows; macOS; Linux (in development); iOS (beta); Android (beta)
- Available in: 12 languages
- List of languages American English, Chinese (China), Danish, French, German, Italian, Japanese, Polish, Portuguese, Russian, Spanish, Turkish
- License: LGPL-2.1-or-later
- Website: secondlife.com
- Repository: github.com/secondlife/viewer

Second Life Server
- Developer: Linden Lab
- Release: June 23, 2003; 23 years ago
- Stable release: 2025-03-14.13862207703 (March 14, 2025; 20 months ago) [±]
- Written in: C++; LSL / LSO (Script engine); Mono (Script engine); Lua (Script engine / In Development); Python
- Middleware: Havok
- Platform: Linux
- License: Proprietary
- Website: secondlife.com

Second Life is a multi-user virtual world that allows people to create an avatar for themselves and then interact with other users (known as 'Residents') and user-created content within a multi-user online environment. Developed for personal computers by the San Francisco-based firm Linden Lab, it publicly launched on June 23, 2003, and saw rapid growth for some years; in 2013, it had approximately one million regular users. Growth eventually stabilized, and by the end of 2017, the active user count had fallen to "between 800,000 and 900,000". In many ways, Second Life is similar to massively multiplayer online role-playing video games; nevertheless, Linden Lab is emphatic that their creation is not a game: "There is no manufactured conflict, no set objective."

The virtual world can be accessed freely via Linden Lab's own client software or via alternative third-party viewers. Second Life users, also called 'residents', create virtual representations of themselves, called avatars, and are able to interact with places, objects and other avatars. They can explore the world (known as the grid), meet other residents, socialize, participate in both individual and group activities, build, create, shop, and trade virtual property and services with one another.

The platform principally features 3D-based user-generated content. Second Life also has its own virtual currency, the Linden Dollar (L$), which is exchangeable with real world currency. Second Life is intended for people ages 16 and over, with the exception of 13–15-year-old users, who are restricted to the Second Life region of a sponsoring institution (e.g., a school).

== History ==
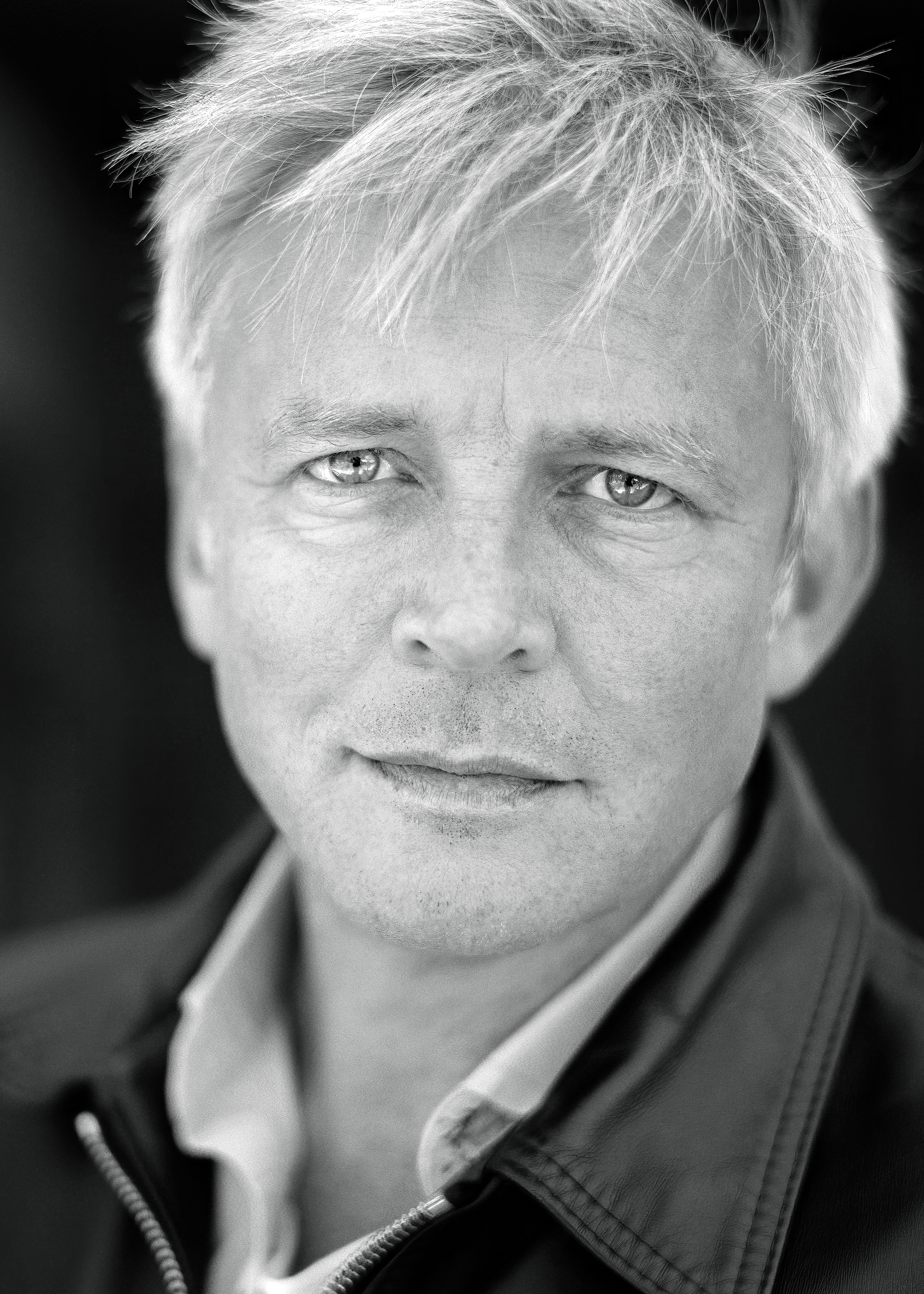
Philip Rosedale, creator of Second Life

Philip Rosedale formed Linden Lab in 1999 with the intention of developing computer hardware to allow people to become immersed in a virtual world. In its earliest form, the company struggled to produce a commercial version of the hardware, known as "The Rig", which in prototype form was seen as a clunky steel contraption with computer monitors worn on shoulders. That vision changed into the software application Linden World, in which people participated in task-based games and socializing in a three-dimensional online environment. That effort eventually transformed into the better-known, user-centered Second Life. Although he was familiar with the metaverse of Neal Stephenson's 1992 novel Snow Crash, Rosedale has said that his vision of virtual worlds predates that book, and that he conducted early virtual world experiments during his college years at the University of California, San Diego, where he studied physics.

Second Life began to receive significant media attention in 2005 and 2006, including a cover story in BusinessWeek magazine featuring the virtual world and Second Life avatar Anshe Chung. By that time, Anshe Chung had become Second Life's poster child and symbol for the economic opportunities that the virtual world offers to its residents. At the same time, the service saw a period of exponential growth of its user base.

One of the principal developers, Cory Ondrejka, was forced to resign as chief technology officer in December 2007, with Rosedale citing irreconcilable differences in the way the company was run. Nevertheless, the platform continued to grow rapidly, and by January 2008, residents spent a total of 28,274,505 hours "inworld" and on average 38,000 residents were logged in at any moment. The maximum concurrency (number of avatars inworld) recorded was set at 88,200 in the first quarter of 2009.

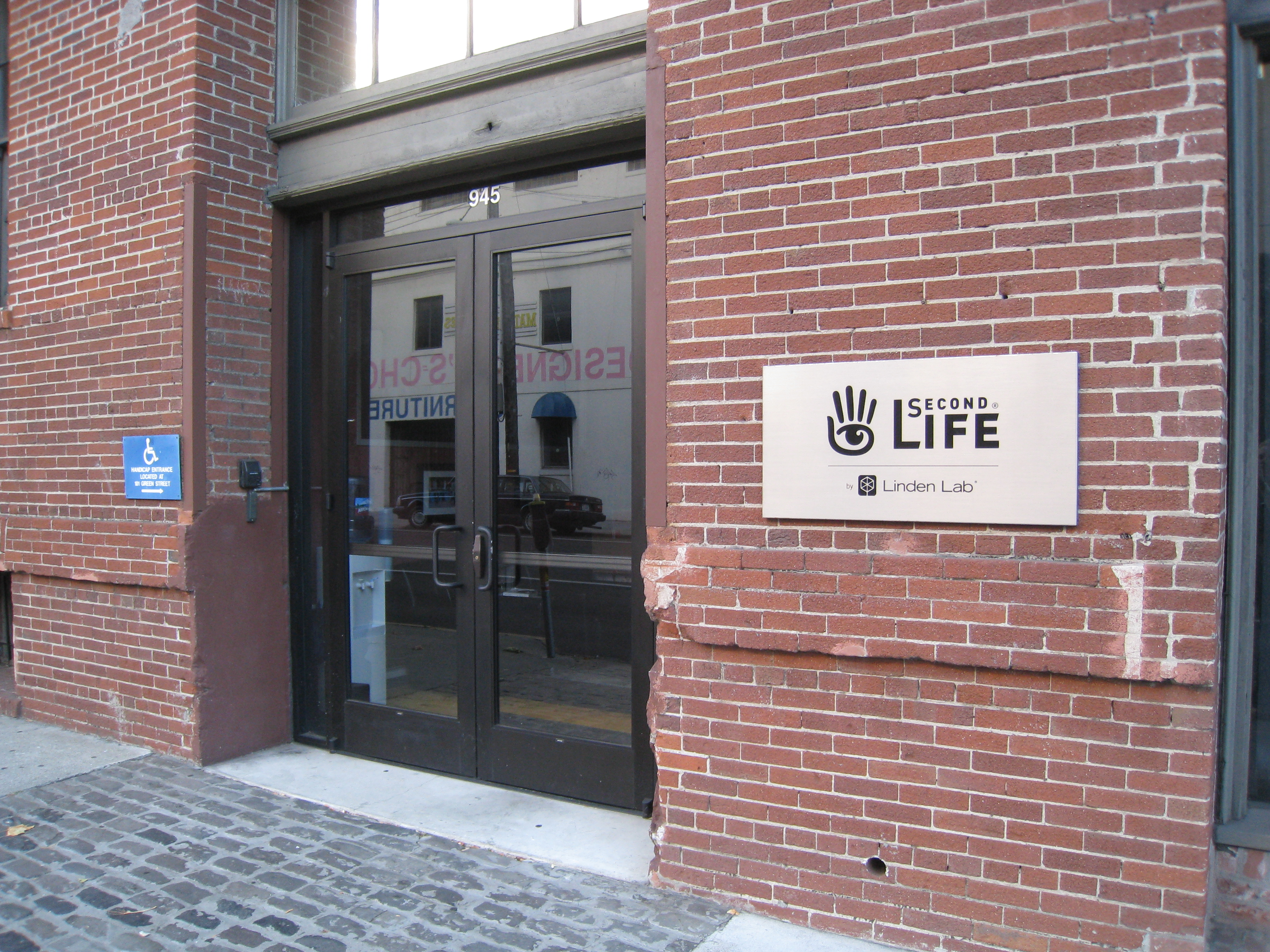
Headquarters of Linden Lab, creator of Second Life

Second Life was honored at the Technology & Engineering Emmy Awards for advancing the development of online sites with user-generated content in 2008, adding to the media attention. Rosedale accepted the award, although he had announced plans to step down from his position as Linden Lab CEO and to become chairman of Linden Lab's board of directors instead in March 2008. Rosedale announced Mark Kingdon as the new CEO effective May 15, 2008. In 2010, Kingdon was replaced by Rosedale, who took over as interim CEO. After four months, Rosedale abruptly stepped down from the Interim CEO position. It was announced in October 2010 that Bob Komin, Linden Lab's chief financial officer and chief operating officer, would take over the CEO job for the immediate future.

With the platform's failure to continue its high rate of growth after 2009, Linden Lab announced layoffs of 30% of its workforce in 2010. Some 21.3 million accounts were registered by this point, although the company did not make public any statistics regarding actual long-term consistent usage and numbers of dormant accounts.

Despite speculation as to the actual size of the user base, Second Life continued as a commercial success. In 2015, Second Life users cashed out approximately US$60 million and Second Life had an estimated GDP of US$500 million, higher than some small countries.

Recognizing improvements in computing power and particularly in computer graphics, Linden Lab began work on a successor to Second Life, a VR experience called Sansar, launching a public beta in July 2017. Uptake was low and Linden Lab halted development in 2020 to focus their attention fully on Second Life. The rights to Sansar's assets were sold to Wookey Search Technologies, who are expected to continue development on the title without Linden Lab. Second Life has been cited as the first example of the metaverse, a concept which has been taken up by other major corporations such as Facebook in 2021. As a notable precursor (which retains a small and loyal following), it provides several examples of virtual reality social issues and lessons learned.

== Classification ==
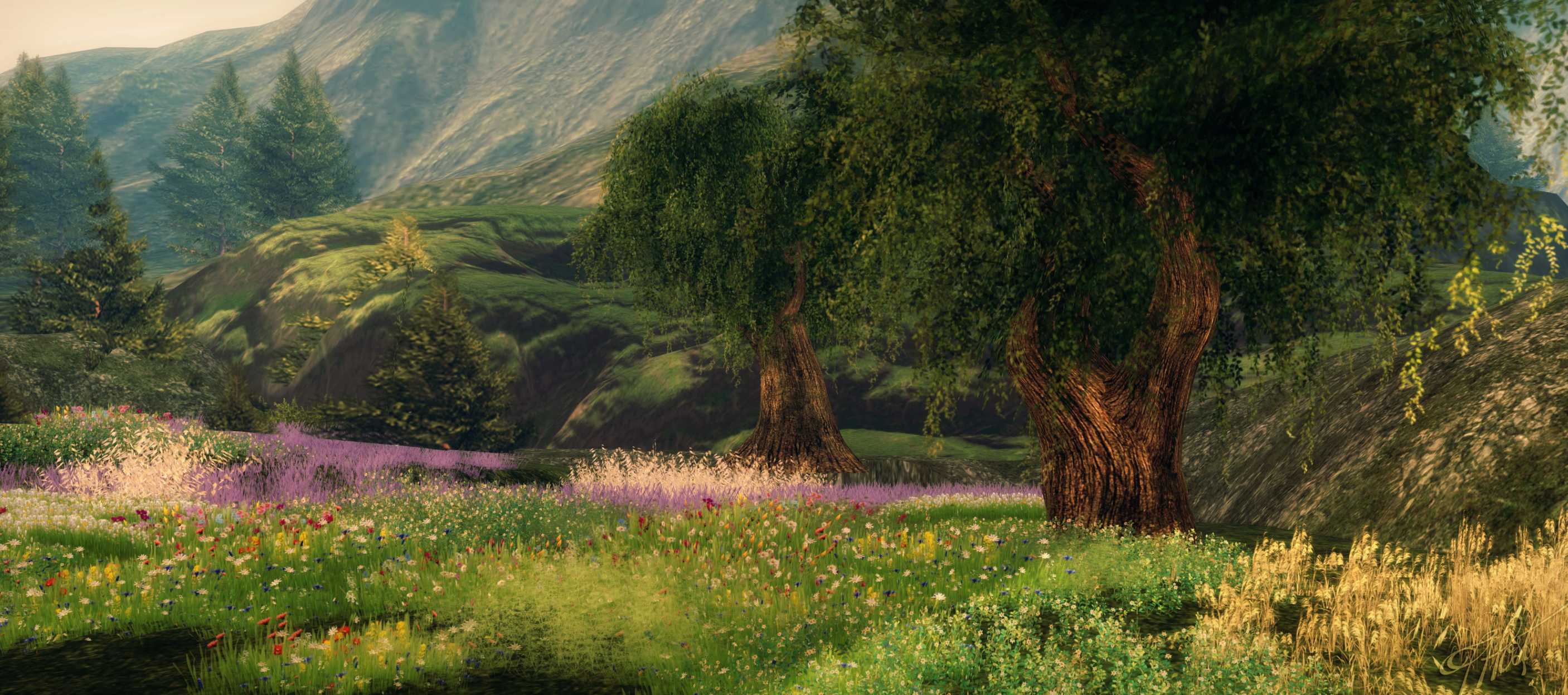
Landscape scenery from The Pilgrim's Dawn located in Second Life

During a 2001 meeting with investors, Rosedale noticed that the participants were particularly responsive to the collaborative, creative potential of Second Life. As a result, the initial objective-driven, gaming focus of Second Life was shifted to a more user-created, community-driven experience.

Second Life's status as a virtual world, a computer game, or a talker, is frequently debated. Unlike traditional computer games, Second Life does not have a designated objective, nor traditional game play mechanics or rules. As it does not have any stipulated goals, it is irrelevant to talk about winning or losing in relation to Second Life. Likewise, unlike a text-based talker, Second Life contains an extensive world that can be explored and interacted with, and it can be used purely as a creative tool set. In March 2006, while speaking at Google TechTalks, Rosedale said: "So, we don't see this as a game. We see it as a platform."

Second Life used to offer two main grids: one for adults (18+) and one for teens. In August 2010, Linden Lab closed the teen grid due to operating costs. Since then, users 16 and over can sign up for a free account. Other limited accounts are available for educators who use Second Life with younger students.

There are three activity-based classifications, called "Ratings", for sims in Second Life:

1. General (formerly PG) – no extreme violence or nudity
2. Moderate (formerly Mature) – some violence, swearing, adult situations, nudity
3. Adult – may contain overt sexual activity, nudity, and violence

As of October 2024, live streaming service Twitch lists Second Life as a 'prohibited game' which cannot be streamed on the service.

== Residents and avatars ==
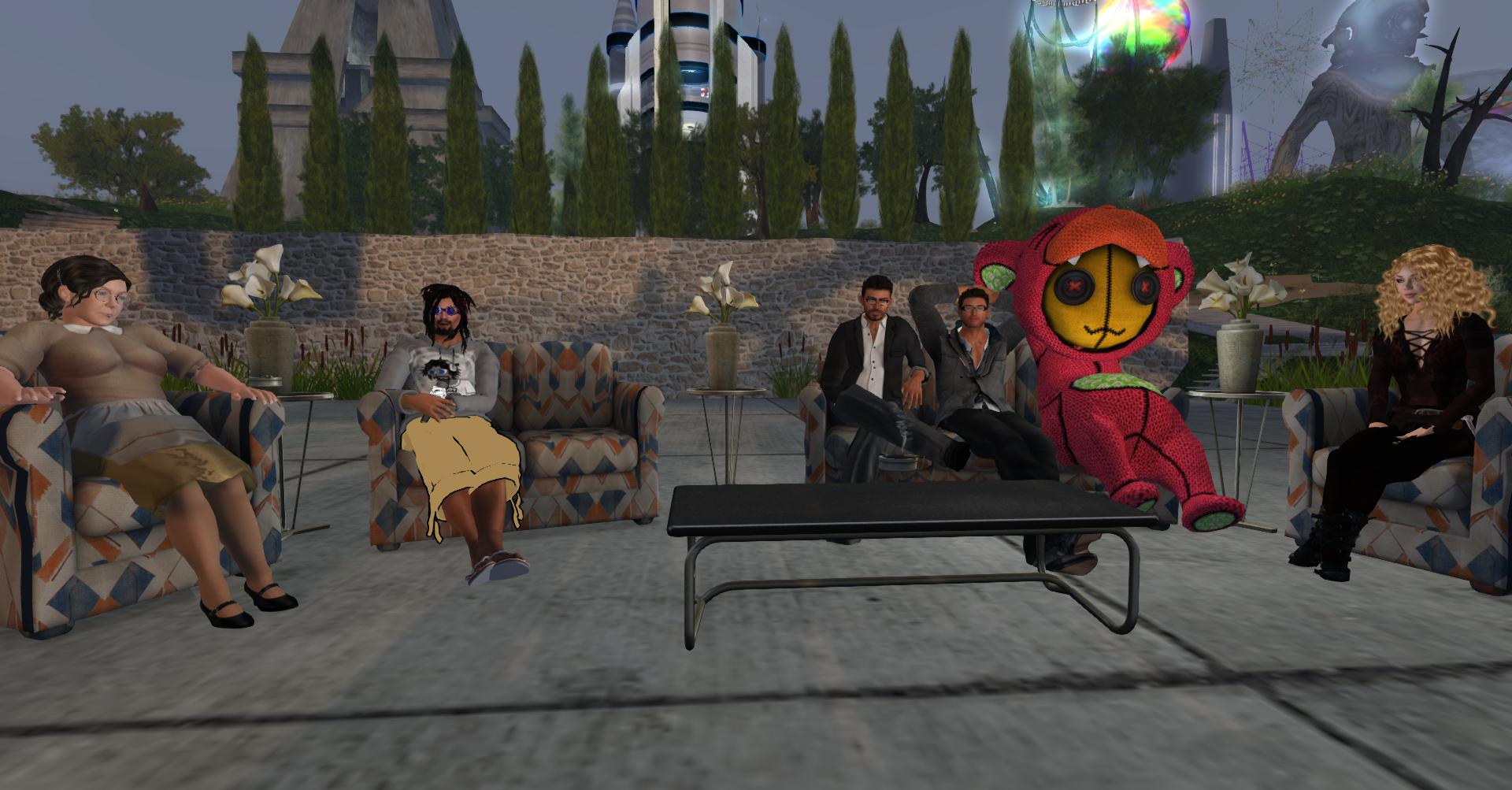
Several avatars together

There is no charge for creating a Second Life account or for making use of the world for any period of time. Linden Lab reserves the right to charge for the creation of large numbers of multiple accounts for a single person (5 per household, 2 per 24 hours) but at present does not do so. A Premium membership (US$11.99 monthly, US$32.97 quarterly, or US$99 annually) extends access to an increased level of technical support, and also pays an automatic stipend of L$300/week into the member's avatar account, and after 45 days that resident will receive a L$700 bonus, making it L$1,000 for that week. This amount has decreased since the original stipend of L$500, which is still paid to older accounts. Certain accounts created during an earlier period may receive L$400. This stipend, if changed into USD, means that the actual cost for the benefit of extended tech support for an annual payment of US$72 is only about US$14, depending on the currency exchange rates. However, the vast majority of casual users of Second Life do not upgrade beyond the free "basic" account.

Avatars may take any form users choose (human, animal, vegetable, mineral, or a combination thereof) or residents may choose to resemble themselves as they are in real life. They may choose even more abstract forms, given that almost every aspect of an avatar is fully customizable. Second Life culture consists of many activities and behaviors that are also present in real life. A single resident account may have only one avatar at a time, although the appearance of this avatar can change between as many different forms as the Resident wishes. Avatar forms, like almost everything else in Second Life, can be either created by the user, or bought pre-made. A single person may also have multiple accounts, and thus appear to be multiple Residents (a person's multiple accounts are referred to as alternate character (alts)).

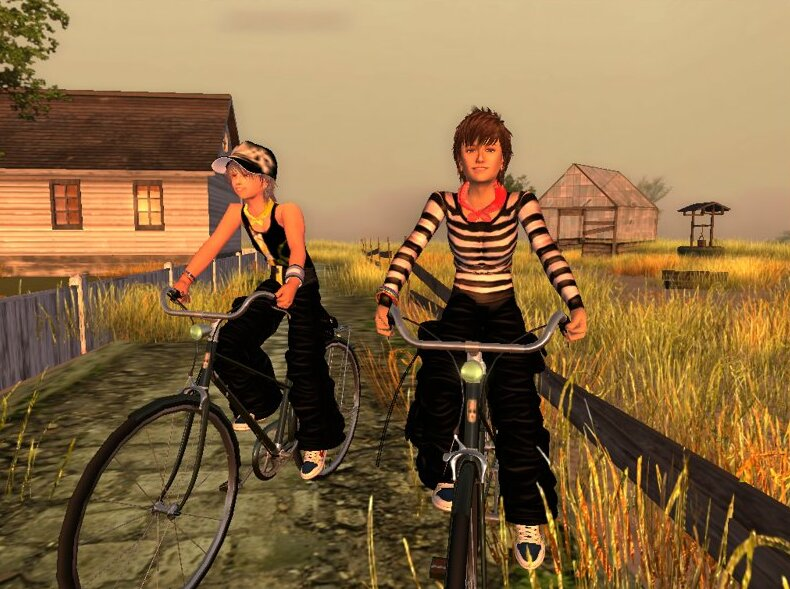
Riding bicycles is one of the forms of transportation in Second Life.

Avatars can travel via walking, running, vehicular access, flying, or teleportation. Because Second Life is such a vast virtual world, teleportation is used when avatars wish to travel instantly and efficiently. Once they reach their destination, they may travel in more conventional means at various speeds.

Avatars can communicate via local chat, group chat, global instant messaging (known as IM), and voice (public, private and group). Chatting is used for localized public conversations between two or more avatars, and is visible to any avatar within a given distance. IMs are used for private conversations, either between two avatars, or among the members of a group, or even between objects and avatars. Unlike chatting, IM communication does not depend on the participants being within a certain distance of each other. As of version 1.18.1.2 (2007-Aug-02), voice chat, both local and IM, was also available. Instant messages may optionally be sent to a Resident's email when the Resident is logged off, although message length is limited to 4096 bytes.

Identities in Second Life can relate to the users' personality or creating their own character. It is based on their decisions on how to express themselves. Most avatars are human, but they can choose to be vampires or animals. Sometimes, what they choose does not relate to their offline selves.

In Coming of Age in Second Life: An Anthropologist Explores the Virtually Human, anthropologist Tom Boellstorff notes that the interface of Second Life is designed with the purpose of disconnecting a player's virtual identity from their physical identity in mind. As of 2015, Second Life has made it possible to display one's legal name in the player's profile or as their screen name, but when Boellstorff first published the book in 2008, users were required to select a last name from a pre-determined list of options. Boellstorff describes this mentality as being in direct contrast to the one held by other mainstream social media websites, where anonymity is shunned and users are encouraged to make the link between their online and physical presence clear.

== Content ==
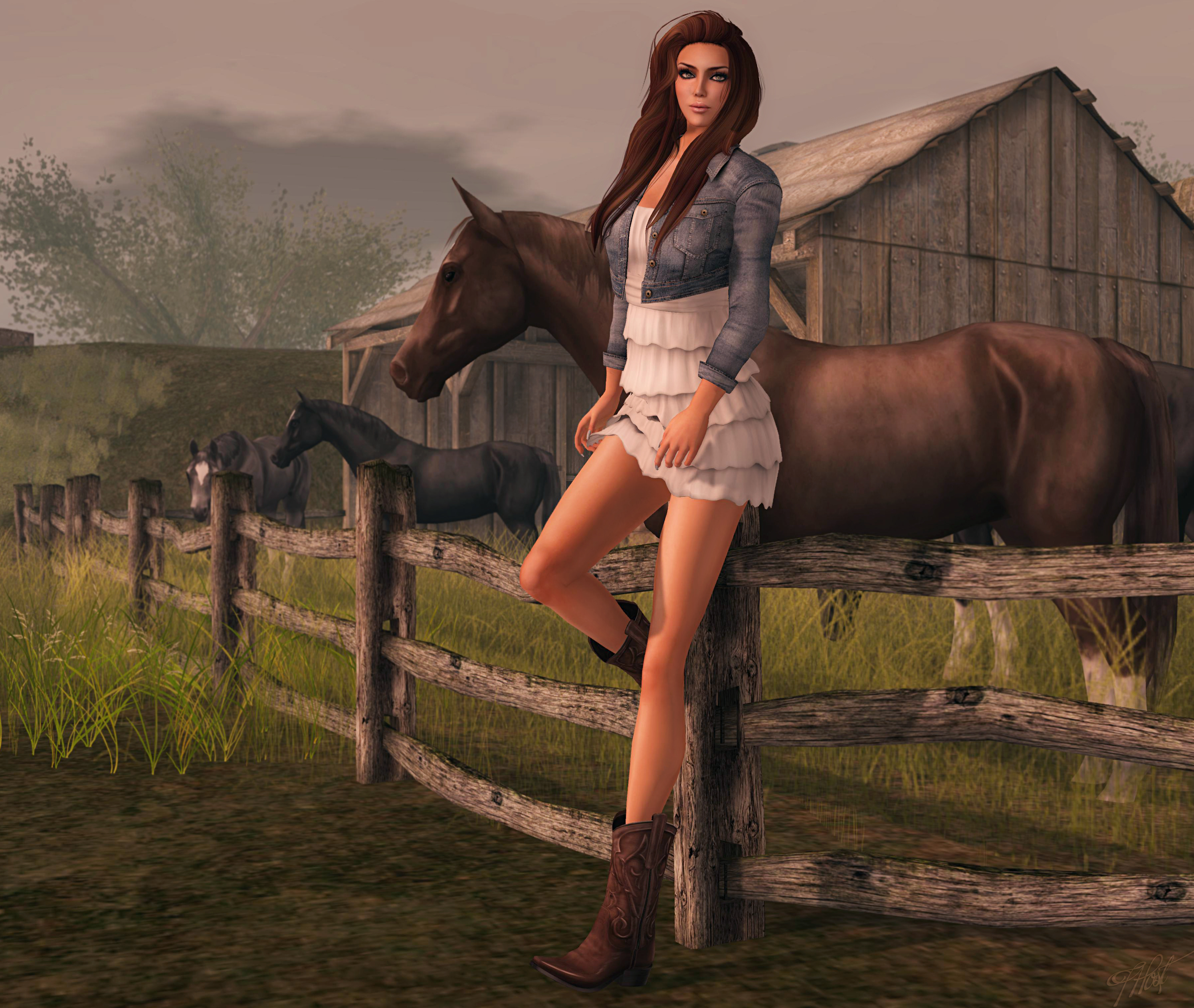
Many different clothes created by users can be purchased in Second Life.

The ability to create content and shape the Second Life world is one of the key features that separate this from online games. Built into the software is a 3D modeling tool based on simple geometric shapes that allows residents to build virtual objects. There is also a procedural scripting language, Linden Scripting Language (LSL), which can be used to add interactivity to objects. Sculpted prims ("sculpties"), 3D mesh, textures for clothing or other objects, animations, and gestures can be created using external software and imported. The Second Life terms of service provide that users retain copyright for any content they create, and the server and client provide simple digital rights management (DRM) functions. However, Linden Lab changed their terms of service in August 2013 to be able to use user-generated content for any purpose. The new terms of service prevent users from using textures from third-party texture services, as some of them pointed out explicitly.

== Economy ==
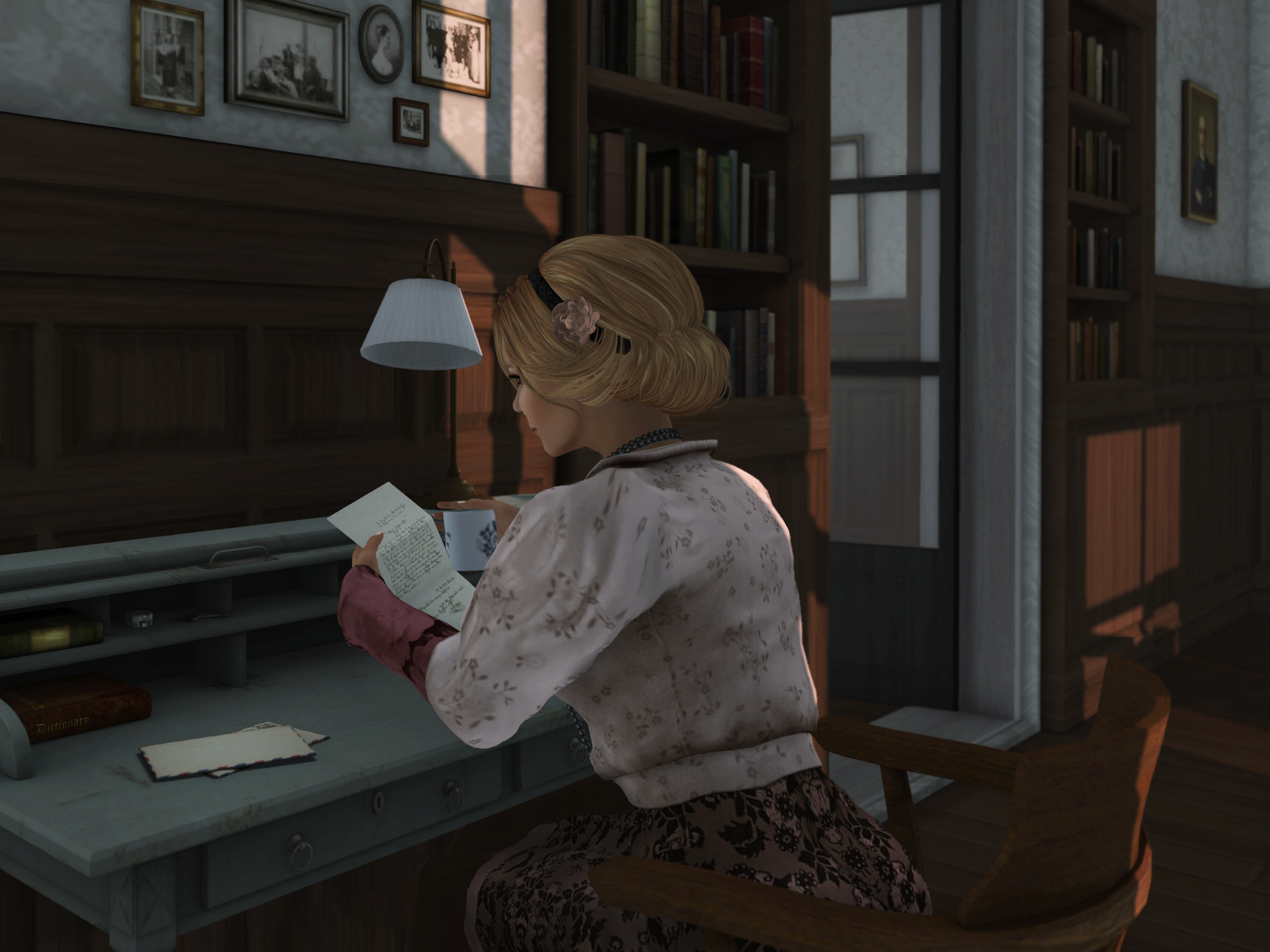
An avatar in the virtual world Second Life

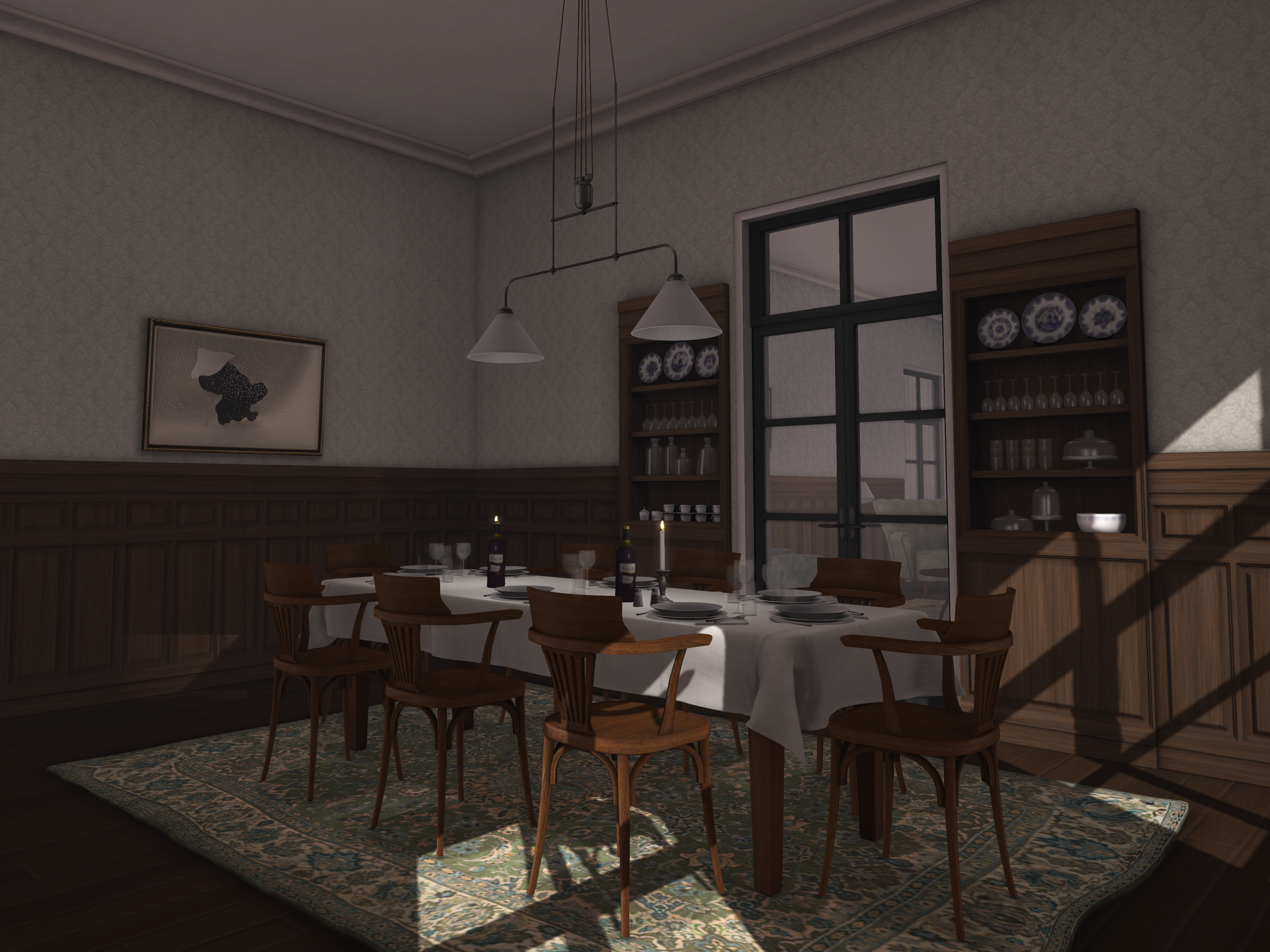
User-generated content in the virtual world Second Life

Second Life has an internal economy and closed-loop virtual token called the Linden Dollar (L$). L$ can be used to buy, sell, rent or trade land or goods and services with other users. The "Linden Dollar" is a closed-loop virtual token for use only within the Second Life platform. Linden Dollars have no monetary value and are not redeemable for monetary value from Linden Lab. However, the presence of a currency exchange has led to the Linden Dollar being recognised as a centralized virtual currency, a fiat currency, or property. A resident with a surplus of Linden Dollars earned via a Second Life business or experiential play can request to refund their Linden Dollar surplus to PayPal. Linden Lab reports that the Second Life economy generated US$3,596,674 in economic activity during the month of September 2005, and in September 2006, Second Life was reported to have a GDP of $64 million. In 2009, the total size of the Second Life economy grew 65% to US$567 million, about 25% of the entire U.S. virtual goods market. Gross resident earnings are US$55 million in 2009 – 11% growth over 2008. In 2013, Linden Lab released an info graphic that showed that over 10 years $3.2 billion in transactions for virtual goods had exchanged between Second Life residents, with an average of 1.2 million daily transactions.

There is a high level of entrepreneurial activity in Second Life. Residents of Second Life are able to create virtual objects and other content. Second Life is unique in that users retain all the rights to their content which means they can use Second Life to distribute and sell their creations, with 2.1 million items listed on its online marketplace. At its height circa 2006, hundreds of thousands of dollars were changing hands daily as residents created and sold a wide variety of virtual commodities. Second Life also quickly became profitable due to the selling and renting of virtual real estate. 2006 also saw Second Life's first real-world millionaire; Ailin Graef, better known as Anshe Chung (her avatar), converted an initial investment of US$9.95 into over one million dollars over the course of two and a half years. She built her fortune primarily by buying, selling, and renting virtual real estate.

Major tech corporations have tried to use Second Life to market products or services to Second Life's tech-savvy audience. IBM, for example, purchased 12 islands within Second Life for virtual training and simulations of key business processes, but has since moved on to other platforms due to maintenance costs. Others, like musicians, podcasters, and news organizations (including CNET, Reuters, NPR's The Infinite Mind, and the BBC), have all had a presence within Second Life.

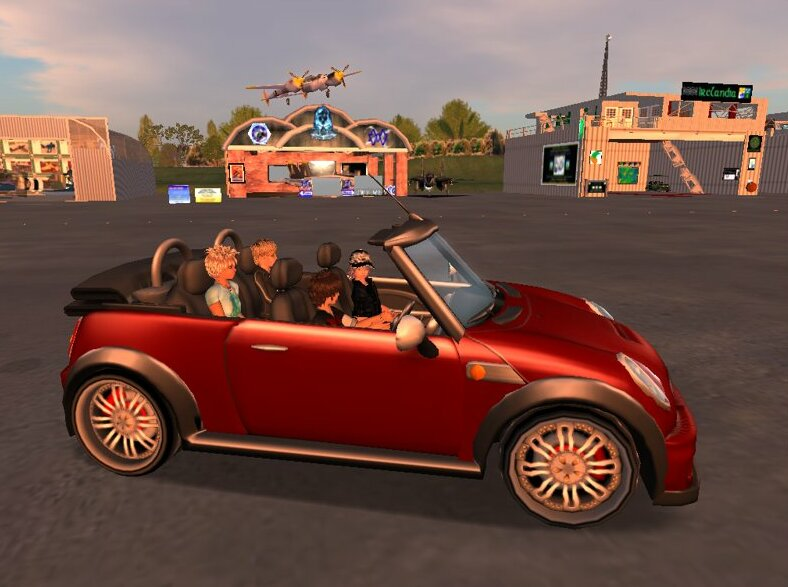
A car (that looks like a Mini Roadster) cruising near an airport

Virtual goods include buildings, vehicles, devices of all kinds, animations, clothing, skin, hair, jewelry, flora and fauna, and works of art. Services include business management, entertainment, and custom content creation (which can be broken up into the following six categories: building, texturing, scripting, animating, art direction, and the position of producer/project funder). L$ can be purchased using US dollars and other local currencies on the LindeX exchange provided by Linden Lab. Customer USD wallets obtained from Linden Dollar sales on the Lindex are most commonly used to pay Second Life's own subscription and tier fees; only a relatively small number of users earn enough profit to request a refund to PayPal. According to figures published by Linden Lab, about 64,000 users made a profit in Second Life in February 2009, of whom 38,524 made less than US$10, while 233 made more than US$5,000. Profits are derived from selling virtual goods, renting land, and a broad range of services.

== Technology ==
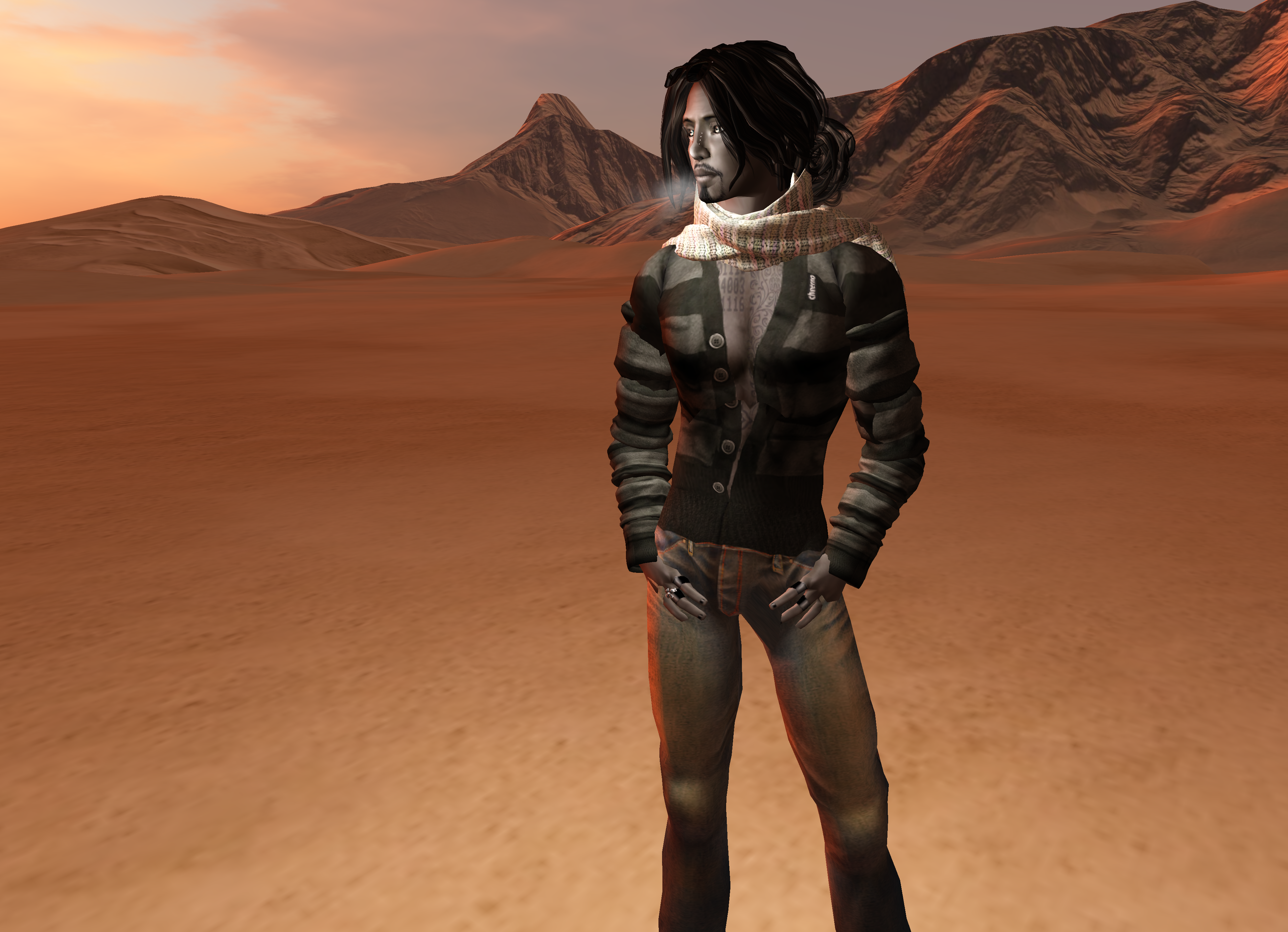
Male avatar in Desert Wilderness

Second Life comprises the viewer (also known as the client) executing on the user's personal computer, and several thousand servers operated by Linden Lab.

=== Client ===
Linden Lab provides official viewers for the operating systems Windows, macOS, and most distributions of Linux where the more known ChromeOS has been excluded so far. The viewer renders 3D graphics using OpenGL technology. The viewer source code was released under the GPL in 2007 and moved to the LGPL in 2010.

There are now several mature third-party viewer projects, the most popular being Firestorm, that contain features not available in the Linden Lab 'Official' client, target other platforms or cater to specialist and accessibility needs. The main focus of third party development is exploring new ideas and working with Linden Lab to deliver new functionality.

An independent project, libopenmetaverse, offers a function library for interacting with Second Life servers. libopenmetaverse has been used to create non-graphic third party viewers.

There are several Alternate Viewers published by Linden Lab used for software testing by volunteers for early access to upcoming projects. Some of these clients only function on the "beta grid" consisting of a limited number of regions running various releases of unstable test server code.

=== Server ===
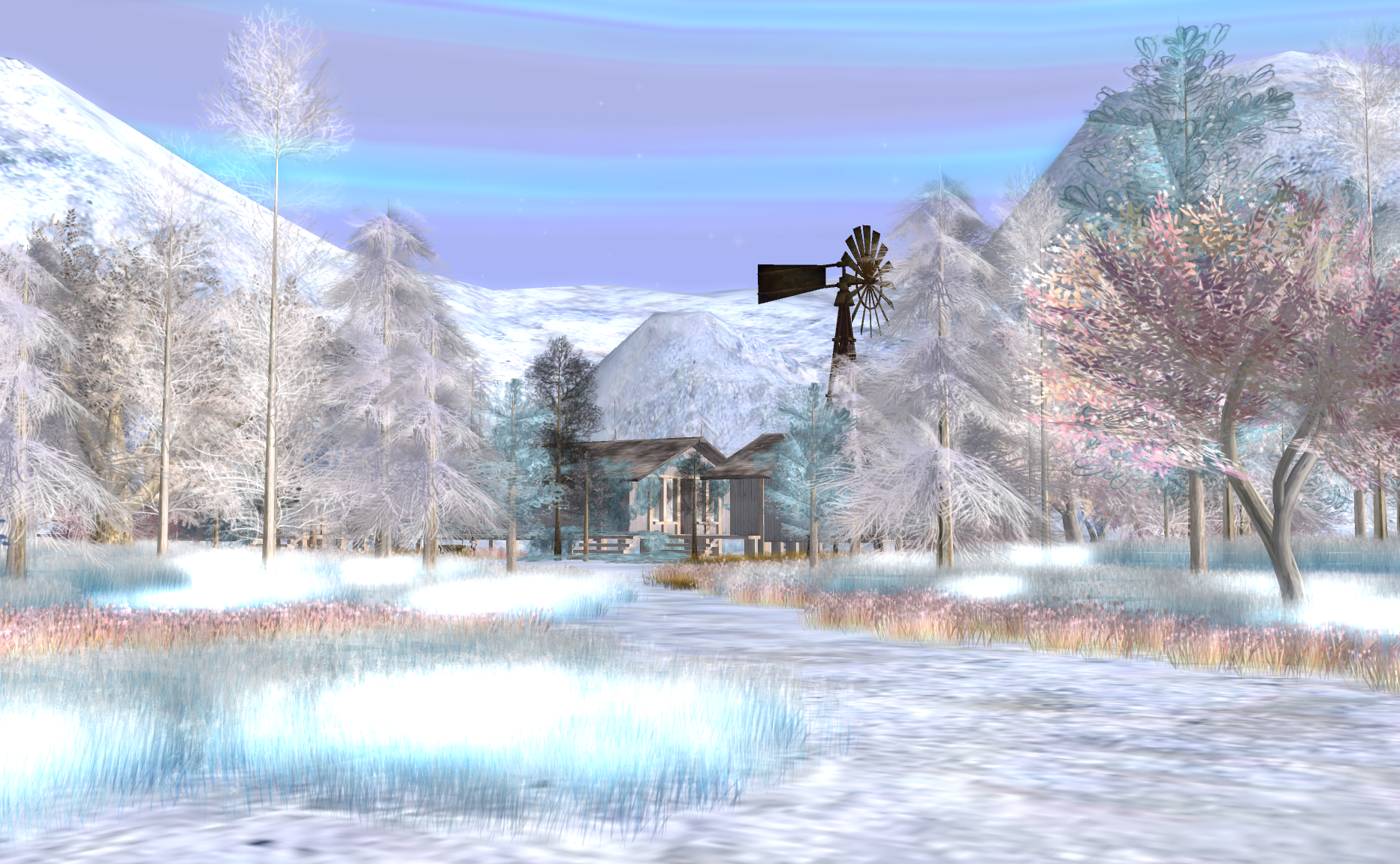
Winter landscape in Second Life

Each full region (an area of 256×256 meters) in the Second Life "grid" runs on a single dedicated core of a multi-core server. Homestead regions share 3 regions per core and Openspace Regions share 4 regions per core, running proprietary software on Debian Linux. These servers run scripts in a region, and provide communication between avatars and objects present in a region.

Every item in the Second Life universe is referred to as an asset. This includes the shapes of basic 3D polygon objects formally known as Primitive Mesh (commonly known as primitives or prims for short), the digital images referred to as textures that decorate primitives, digitized audio clips, avatar shape and appearance, avatar skin textures, LSL scripts, information written on notecards, and so on. Each asset is referenced with a universally unique identifier or UUID.

Assets are stored on Isilon Systems storage clusters, comprising all data that has ever been created by anyone who has been in the Second Life world. Infrequently used assets are offloaded to S3 bulk storage. As of December 2007, the total storage was estimated to consume 100 terabytes of server capacity. The asset servers function independently of the region simulators, though the region simulators act as a proxy for the client, request object data from the asset servers when a new object loads into the simulator. Region simulators areas are commonly known as sims by residents.

Each server instance runs a physics simulation to manage the collisions and interactions of all objects in that region. Objects can be nonphysical and non-moving, or actively physical and movable. Complex shapes may be linked together in groups of up to 256 separate primitives. Additionally, each player's avatar is treated as a physical object so that it may interact with physical objects in the world. As of 9 July 2014, Second Life simulators use the Havok 2011.2 physics engine for all in-world dynamics. This engine is capable of simulating thousands of physical objects at once.

Linden Lab pursues the use of open standards technologies, and uses free and open source software such as Apache, MySQL, Squid and Linux. The plan is to move everything to open standards by standardizing the Second Life protocol. Cory Ondrejka, former CTO of Second Life, stated in 2006 that a while after everything has been standardized, both the client and the server will be released as free and open source software.

In January 2021, Linden Lab completed the migration of all of its services and databases to AWS servers.

=== OpenSimulator ===
In January 2007, OpenSimulator was founded as an open-source simulator project. The aim of this project is to develop a full open-source server software for Second Life clients. OpenSIM is BSD Licensed and it is written in C# and can run under Mono environment. From 2008, alternative grids began to emerge and many of these allow cross visits from other grids through the hypergrid protocol using OpenSimulator.

== Applications ==
=== Arts ===
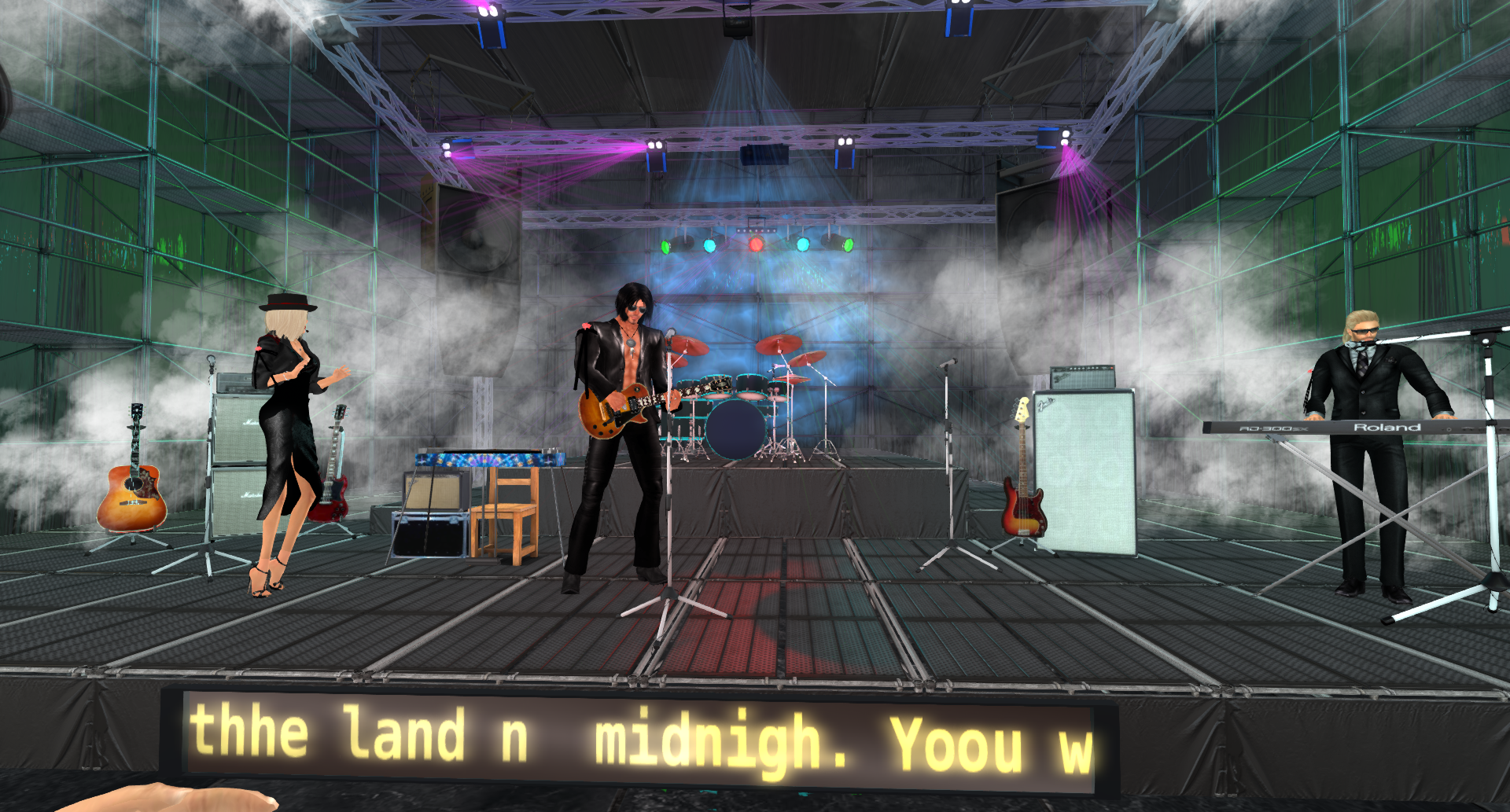
Virtual concert in Second Life

Second Life residents express themselves creatively through virtual world adaptations of art exhibits, live music, live theater and machinima, and other art forms.

=== Competitive entertainment ===
A wide variety of recreational activities, both competitive and non-competitive, take place on the Second Life Grid, including both traditional sports and video game–like scenarios.

=== Education ===
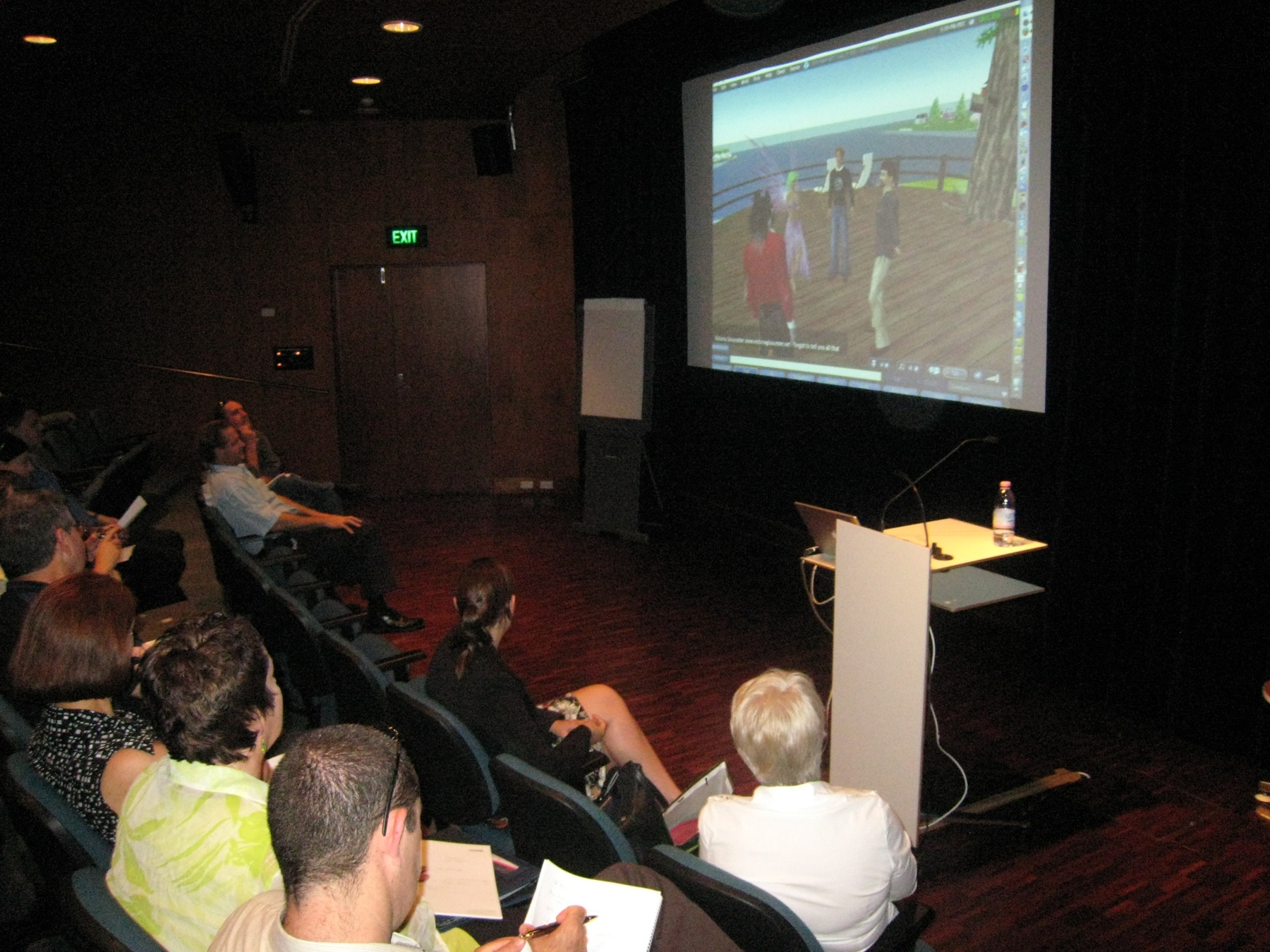
Demonstrating Second Life for audience in Brisbane

Second Life is used as a platform for education by many institutions, such as colleges, universities, libraries and government entities. Since 2008, the University of San Martin de Porres of Peru has been developing Second Life prototypes of Peruvian archeological buildings, and training teachers for this new paradigm of education. The West Virginia University (WVU) Department of Special Education has used Second Life widely in education, and it provided teaching certification and certificates of degree in seven different distance education programs. WVU started a pilot program in the college's computer lab in spring 2011.

=== Embassies ===
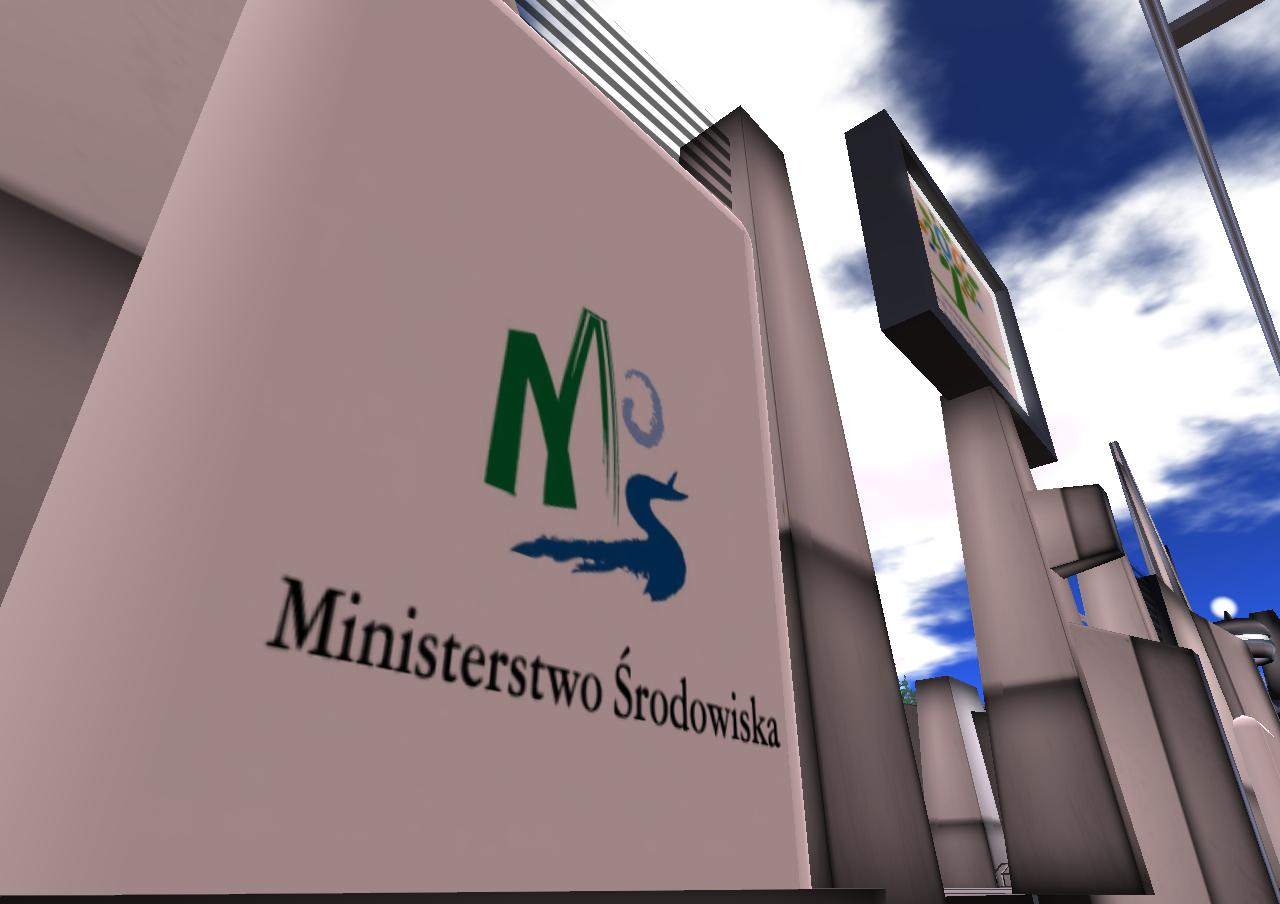
The Ministry of Environment of the Republic of Poland is located virtually in Second Life.

The Maldives was the first country to open an embassy in Second Life. The Maldives' embassy is located on Second Life's "Diplomacy Island", where visitors will be able to talk face-to-face with a computer-generated ambassador about visas, trade and other issues. "Diplomacy Island" also hosts Diplomatic Museum and Diplomatic Academy. The Island is established by DiploFoundation as part of the Virtual Diplomacy Project.

In May 2007, Sweden became the second country to open an embassy in Second Life. Run by the Swedish Institute, the embassy serves to promote Sweden's image and culture, rather than providing any real or virtual services. The Swedish Minister for Foreign Affairs, Carl Bildt, stated on his blog that he hoped he would get an invitation to the grand opening.

In September 2007, Publicis Group announced the project of creating a Serbia island as a part of a project Serbia Under Construction. The project is officially supported by Ministry of Diaspora of Serbian Government. It was stated that the island will feature the Nikola Tesla Museum, the Guča Trumpet Festival and the Exit Festival. It was also planned on opening a virtual info terminals of Ministry of Diaspora.

In December 2007, Estonia became the third country to open an embassy in Second Life. In September 2007, Colombia and Serbia opened embassies. As of 2008, North Macedonia and the Philippines have opened embassies in the "Diplomatic Island" of Second Life. In 2008, Albania opened an embassy in the Nova Bay location. SL Israel was inaugurated in January 2008 in an effort to showcase Israel to a global audience, though without any connection to official Israeli diplomatic channels. In 2008, Malta opened an embassy on Second Life.

=== Religion ===
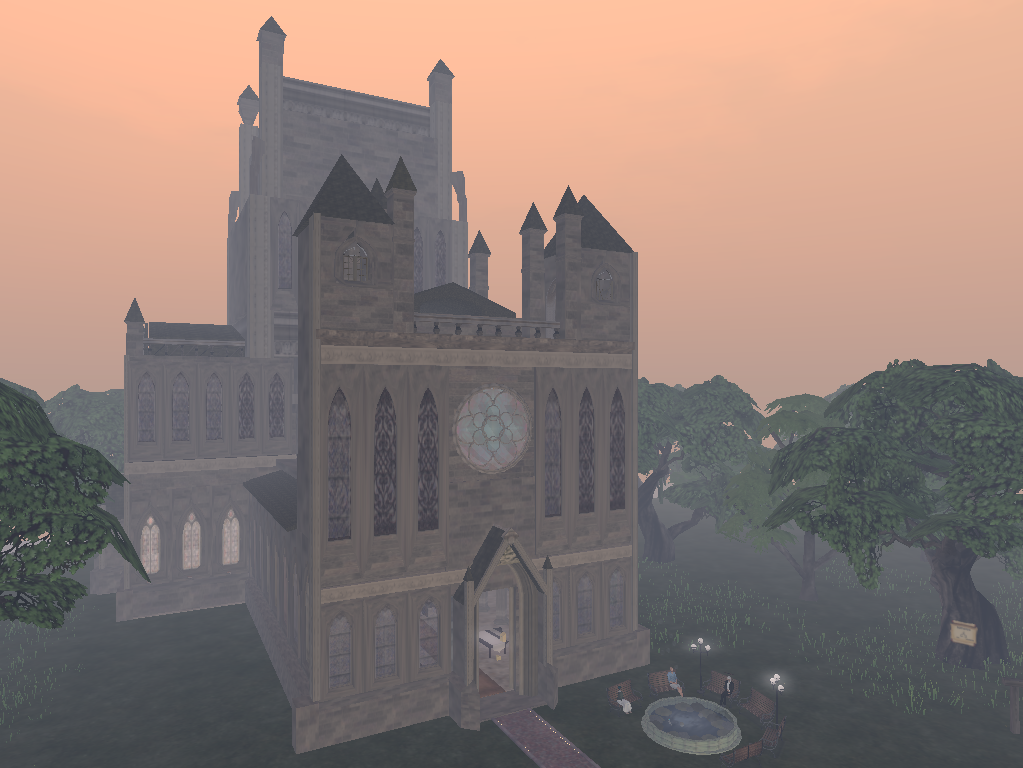
The Anglican Cathedral of Second Life

Religious organizations have also begun to open virtual meeting places within Second Life. In early 2007, LifeChurch.tv, a Christian church headquartered in Edmond, Oklahoma, and with eleven campuses in the US, created "Experience Island" and opened its twelfth campus in Second Life. In July 2007, an Anglican cathedral was established in Second Life; Mark Brown, the head of the group that built the cathedral, noted that there is "an interest in what I call depth, and a moving away from light, fluffy Christianity".

The First Unitarian Universalist Congregation of Second Life was established in 2006. Services have been held regularly, making the FUUCSL Congregation one of the longest-running active congregations in Second Life.

The Egyptian-owned news website Islam Online has purchased land in Second Life to allow Muslims and non-Muslims alike to perform the ritual of Hajj in virtual reality form, obtaining experience before actually making the pilgrimage to Mecca in person.

Second Life also offers several groups that cater to the needs and interests of humanists, atheists, agnostics, and freethinkers. One of the most active groups is SL Humanism which has been holding weekly discussion meetings inside Second Life every Sunday since 2006.

=== Relationships ===
Romantic relationships are common in Second Life, including some couples who have married online and in real life. The social engagement offered by the online environment helps those who might be socially isolated. In addition, sex is often encountered. However, to access the adult sections requires age verification. There are also large BDSM and Gorean communities.

Second Life relationships have been taken from virtual online relationships into personal, real-world relationships. Booperkit Moseley and Shukran Fahid were possibly the first couple to meet in Second Life and then marry in real life. Booperkit travelled to the United States to meet Shukran and he returned to England with her after one week. They married in 2006 and had twin boys in 2009. Some couples meet online, form friendships, and eventually move to finding one another in the real world. Some even have their weddings on Second Life, and in a real-world setting.

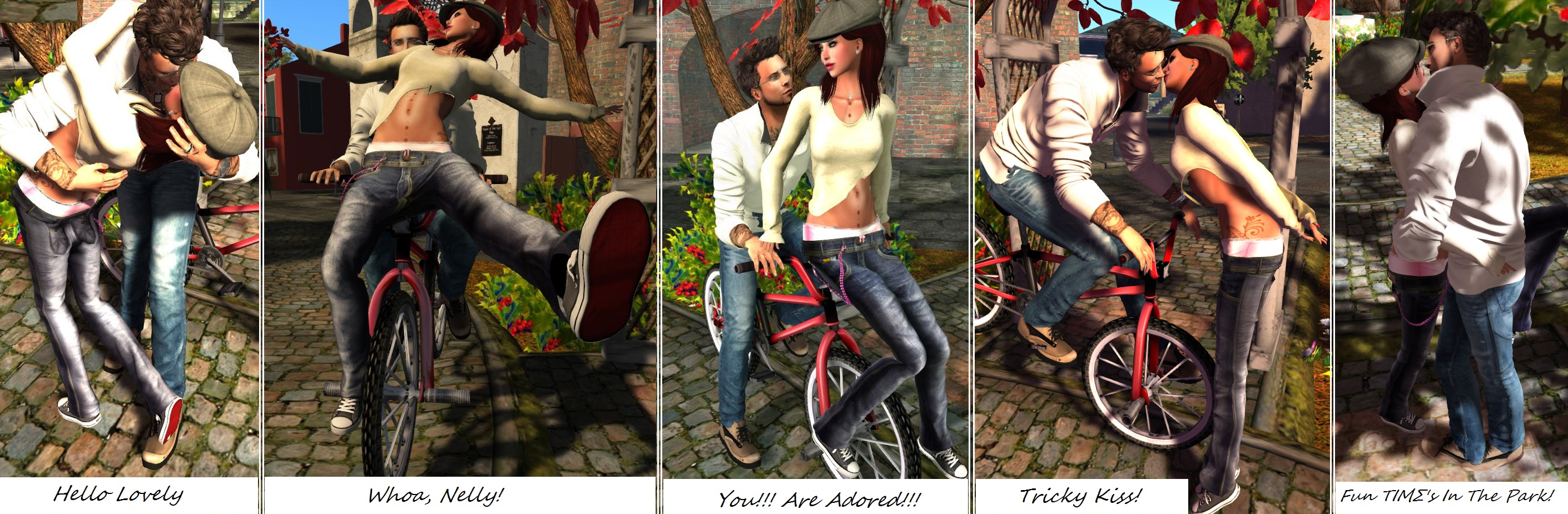

Relationships in virtual worlds have an added dimension compared to other social media, because avatars give a feeling of proximity making the voyeur experience more intense than simply a textual encounter. The complexities of those encounters depend on the engagement levels of the people behind the avatars, whether they are engaging disassociatively (entertainment only), immersively (as if the avatar was them), or augmentatively (meaning they engage for a real-life purpose).

=== Science ===
Second Life is used for scientific research, collaboration, and data visualization. Examples include SciLands, American Chemical Society's ACS Island, Genome, Virginia Tech's SLATE, and Nature Publishing Group's Elucian Islands Village.

=== Social network ===
Second Life can be a real-time, immersive social space for people including those with physical or mental disabilities that impair their lives, who often find comfort and security interacting through anonymous avatars. (Some academics believe using Second Life might even help improve motor ability for people with Parkinson's disease).

An example of how Second Life has been used by disabled people is Wheelies, the widely publicised disability-themed virtual nightclub founded by Simon Stevens.

=== Music streams ===
Shoutcast and Icecast radio stations can be streamed into a land parcel in Second Life. The streaming codec is MP3, as AAC and Vorbis are not currently supported. There are internet radio providers that offer these services or select from a list. At the time of this writing, media on a prim (MOAP) is not a reliable enough way of displaying media and such, sites listed work best with Parcel Media or Parcel Audio.

=== Work spaces ===
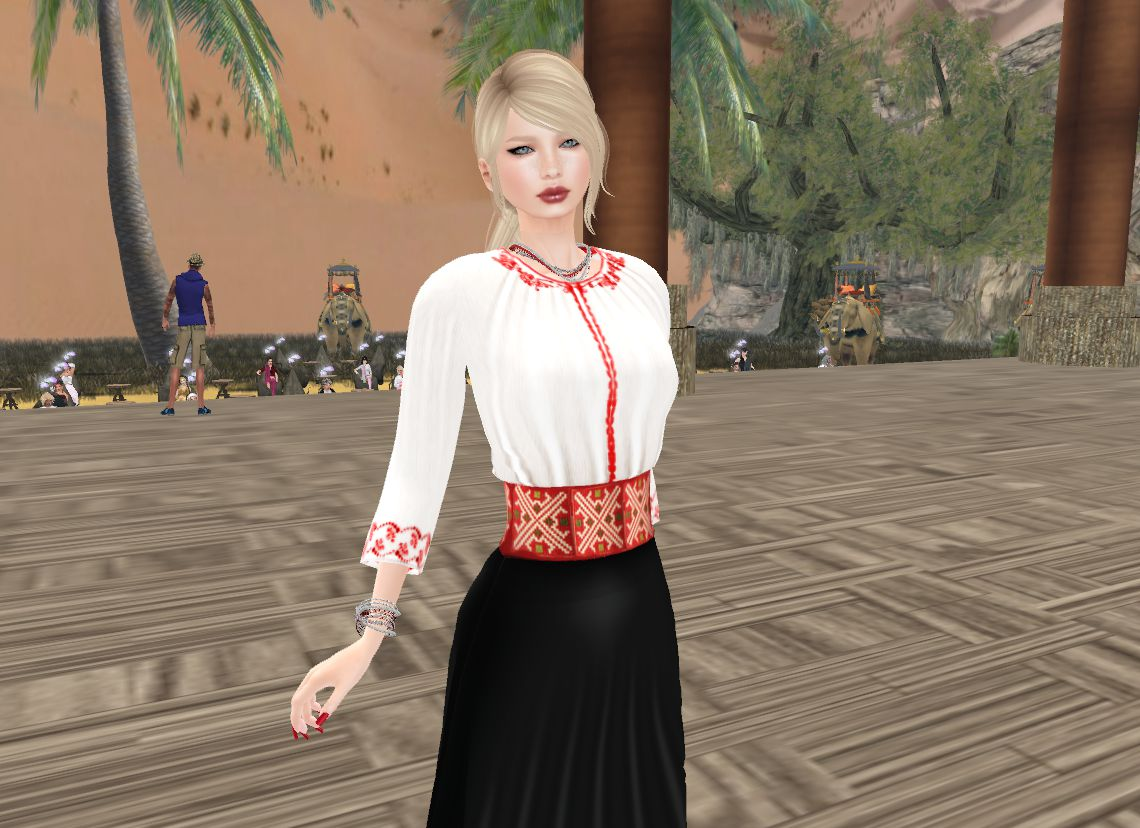
Fashion For Change fashion show held in Second Life in 2015

Second Life gives companies the option to create virtual workplaces to allow employees to virtually meet, hold events, practice any kind of corporate communications, conduct training sessions in 3D immersive virtual learning environment, simulate business processes, and prototype new products.

In 2020, CEO of Second Life Ebbe Altberg announced a microsite for Second Life to serve as a space for digital meetings to take place amidst global social distancing, self-isolation, and quarantine orders during the COVID-19 pandemic.

== Notable events and influence ==
=== Second Life movie ===
In 2007, director David Fincher worked with screenwriter Peter Straughan to make a Second Life movie based on Tim Guest's novel Second Lives. The movie was rumored to feature Sacha Baron Cohen as protagonist Plastic Duck, a zany Second Life resident who drove founder Philip Rosedale bonkers.

=== Ban of Woodbury University ===
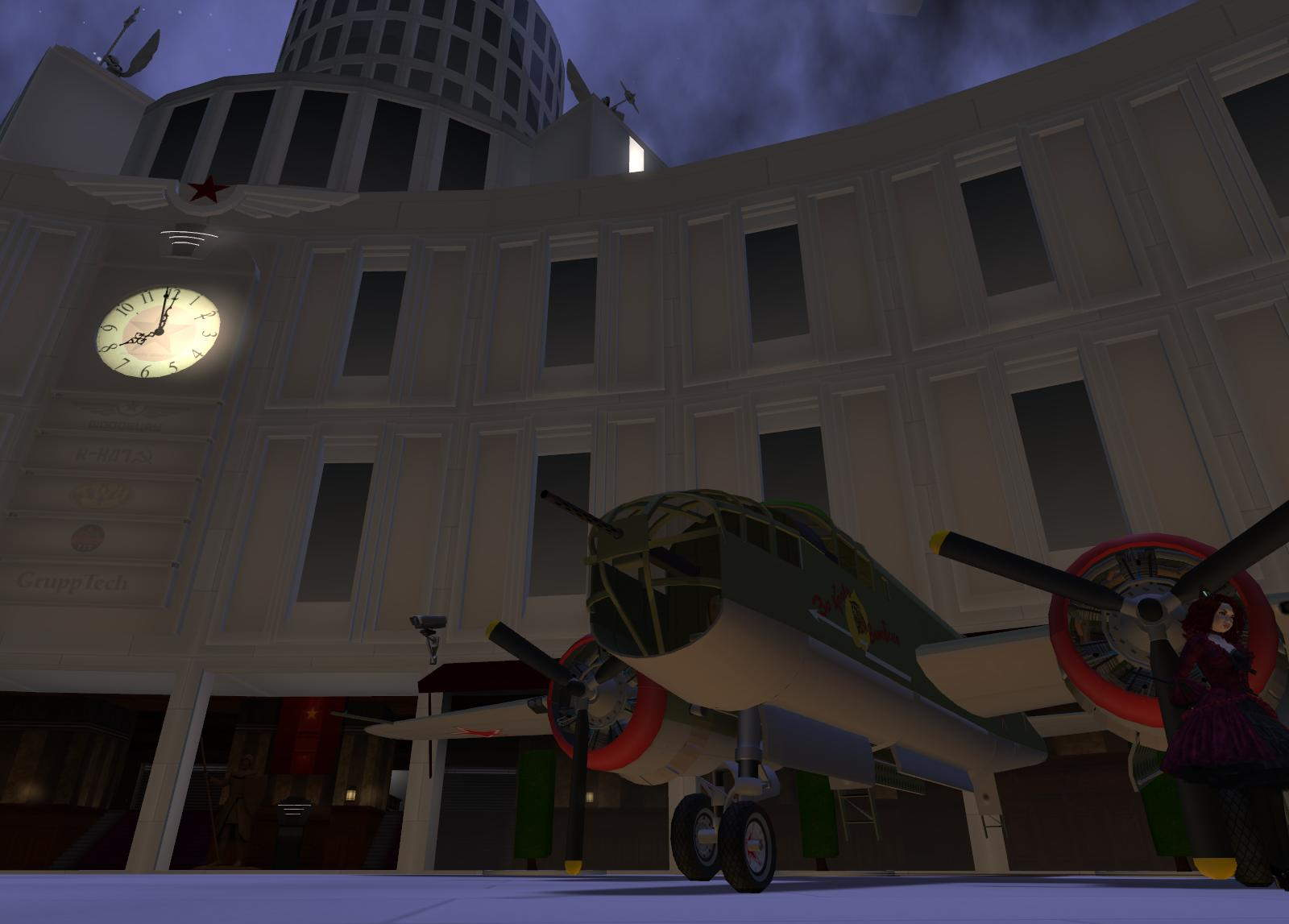
The controversial campus of Woodbury University's School of Media, Culture and Design, which was deleted in 2010 by Linden Lab

Linden Lab has twice, in 2007 and 2010, banned a California educational institution, Woodbury University, from having a representation within Second Life. On April 20, 2010, four simulators belonging to the university were deleted and the accounts of several students and professors terminated, according to The Chronicle of Higher Education. Edward Clift, dean of the School of Media, Culture and Design at Woodbury University, told The Chronicle of Higher Education that their campus "was a living, breathing campus in Second Life", including educational spaces designed mostly by students, such as a mock representation of the former Soviet Union and a replica of the Berlin Wall. According to Clift, the virtual campus did not "conform to what Linden Lab wanted a campus to be".

The article in The Chronicle of Higher Education concluded with: "Meanwhile, many people in Second Life expressed on blogs that they were glad to see the virtual campus go, arguing that it had been a haven for troublemakers in the virtual world."

=== The Alphaville Herald ===
In 2004, the newspaper The Alphaville Herald, founded and edited by the philosopher Peter Ludlow, migrated to Second Life, and in the following years the newspaper played a prominent role in reporting on Second Life and in the public discussion of the game. The newspaper, which was known as The Second Life Herald from 2004 to 2009, was later edited by the Internet pioneer Mark P. McCahill. According to scholars Constantinescu and Decu, The Alphaville Herald was the first "virtual free press," pioneering mass communication in virtual worlds.

=== 2007 "Virtual Riot" ===
In January 2007, a "virtual riot" erupted between members of the French National Front (FN) who had established a virtual HQ on Second Life, and "anti-racism" activists, including Second Life Left Unity, a socialist and anti-capitalist user-group. Since then, several small Internet-based organizations have claimed some responsibility for instigating the riots.

=== Marketing ===
Corporate marketers, especially during the height of Second Life in the cultural zeitgeist of 2005–2010, have been accused of being overly credulous of the actual reach and influence of Second Life. Journalists have theorized this might be partly due to blithely accepting total account statistics rather than harder-to-discern active player counts. Reasons for account "inflation" can include in-world systems which encourage the creation of bogus extra accounts such as "traffic bots" which simply remain stationary in a store, causing the system to rank the store as popular because there are people there, and simply idle and long inactive accounts. One article in Wired featured a marketer for Coca-Cola who found Second Life to be essentially deserted when personally inspecting it, yet still funded a marketing campaign there anyway from fear of missing out.

=== Griefing and denial of service attacks ===
Second Life has been attacked several times by groups of residents abusing the creation tools to create objects that harass other users or damage the system. This included grey goo objects which infinitely reproduce, eventually overwhelming the servers; orbiters which throw an avatar so far upwards they cannot get back down in a reasonable timeframe without teleporting; cages which surround avatars, preventing them from moving, and similar tools. Although combat between users is sanctioned in certain areas of the world, these objects have been used to cause disruption in all areas. Attacks on the grid itself, such as Grey Goo, are strictly forbidden anywhere on the grid. It was possible to perpetrate denial-of-service attacks (DoS) on other users simply by scripting objects that spew screen filling characters from anywhere on the grid to another avatar's location, thereby disabling a clear view to the virtual world. Bugs in the client and server software were also exploited by griefers to kick users, crash servers, and revert content before being patched out.

=== The Emerald client and in-world logging scripts ===
The Emerald client was developed by a group of users based on Snowglobe, an opensource fork of the Second Life client. Several groups alleged that the Emerald viewer contained Trojan code which tracked user details and demographics in a way that the developers could later recover. One of these groups was banned from Second Life by Linden Lab after publishing their discovery. Shortly afterward, a member of the Emerald team was accused of a DDOS attack against another website. In response, Linden Lab revoked Emerald's third-party viewer approval and permanently banned several of Emerald's developers. Due to what happened with Emerald, Linden Lab instituted a new third-party viewer policy.

The support staff and one of the developers of the Emerald project, who was not banned, left to work on a new viewer project, Phoenix (using some of the Emerald codebase, but without Off-the-Record Messaging nor any potentially malicious code). The Phoenix team are now the developers behind Firestorm Viewer, a fork of Second Life's "viewer 2.0" open source client.

=== Vlogger ===
Vlogger is a 2011 Spanish political thriller film that makes heavy use of Second Life through machinima production. The film follows a Pakistani computer specialist who discovers that her brother has been recruited into an Islamic extremist group in the video game. With six days until he plans to commit a suicide bombing, the protagonist enters the digital world of Second Life to stop him. The film debuted at the 2011 Sitges Film Festival.

== Criticism and controversy ==
Second Life has seen a number of controversies. Issues range from the technical (budgeting of server resources), to moral (e.g., pornography and cyberbullying), to legal (legal position of the Linden Dollar, Bragg v. Linden Lab). Security issues have also been a concern.

=== Regulation ===
In the past, large portions of the Second Life economy consisted of businesses that are regulated or banned. Changes to Second Life's terms of service in this regard have largely had the purpose of bringing activity within Second Life into compliance with various international laws, even though the person running the business may be in full compliance with the law in their own country.

On July 26, 2007, Linden Lab announced a ban on in-world gambling due to federal and state regulations on Internet gambling that could affect Linden Lab if it was permitted to continue. The ban was immediately met with in-world protests.

In August 2007, a $750,000 in-world Linden Dollar bank or Ponzi scheme called Ginko Financial collapsed due to a bank run triggered by Linden Lab's ban on gambling. The aftershocks of this collapse caused severe liquidity problems for other virtual "Linden Dollar banks", which critics had long asserted were scams. On Tuesday, January 8, 2008, Linden Lab announced the upcoming prohibition of payment of fixed interest on cash deposits in unregulated banking activities in-world. All banks without real-world charters closed or converted to virtual joint stock companies by January 22, 2008. After the ban, a few companies continue to offer non-interest bearing deposit accounts to residents, such as the e-commerce site XStreet, which had already adopted a zero-interest policy 3 months before the Linden Lab interest ban.

=== Technical issues ===
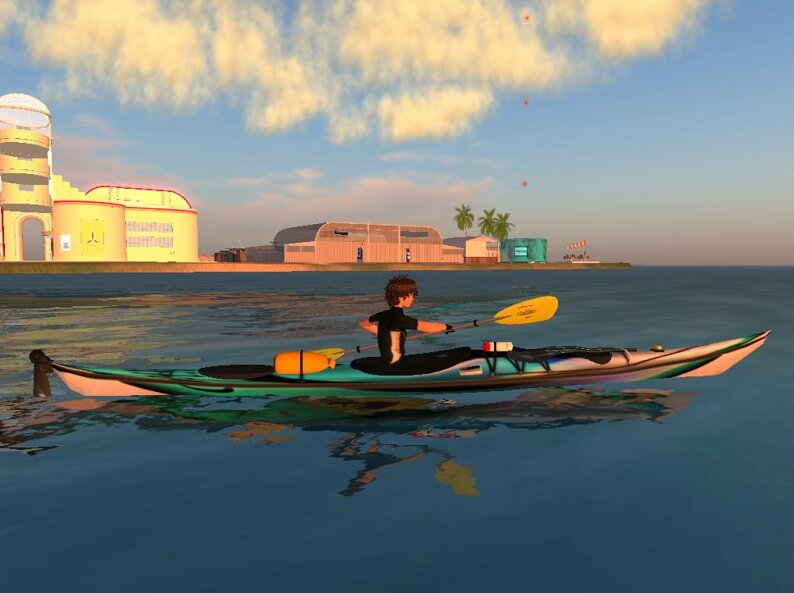
Kayaking through the virtual world

Second Life has suffered from difficulties related to system instability. These include increased system latency, and intermittent client crashes. However, some faults are caused by the system's use of an "asset server" cluster, on which the actual data governing objects is stored separately from the areas of the world and the avatars that use those objects. The communication between the main servers and the asset cluster appears to constitute a bottleneck which frequently causes problems. Typically, when asset server downtime is announced, users are advised not to build, manipulate objects, or engage in business, leaving them with little to do but chat and generally reducing confidence in all businesses on the grid.

Another problem is inventory loss, in which items in a user's inventory, including those which have been paid for, can disappear without warning or permanently enter a state where they will fail to appear in-world when requested (giving an "object missing from database" error). Linden Lab offers no compensation for items that are lost in this way, although a policy change instituted in 2008 allows accounts to file support tickets when inventory loss occurs. Many in-world businesses will attempt to compensate for this or restore items, although they are under no obligation to do so and not all are able to do so. A recent change in how the company handles items which have "lost their parent directory" means that inventory loss is much less of a problem and resolves faster than in recent years. "Loss to recovery times" have gone from months (or never) to hours or a day or two for the majority of users, but inventory loss does still exist.

Second Life functions by streaming all data to the user live over the Internet with minimal local caching of frequently used data. The user is expected to have a minimum of 300 kbit/s of Internet bandwidth for basic functionality. Due to the proprietary communications protocols, it is not possible to use a network proxy service to reduce network load when many people are all using the same location, such as when used for group activities in a school or business.

=== Quality assurance ===
Criticism of quality assurance of Second Life states that Linden Lab focuses too much on bringing new features to the production environment instead of fixing long-standing bugs that, in the worst case, cause financial loss for the users. On April 30, 2007, an open letter signed by over 3,000 users was sent to Linden Lab to protest the quality assurance process of the company. Linden Lab has responded to the open letter.

=== Frame rate ===
Computer hardware and Internet connections capable of smoothly rendering high quality content in other MMOGs may perform poorly in Second Life, resulting in low frame rates and unresponsive controls on even minimal graphical configurations. The problem is especially prevalent when large numbers of avatars congregate in one area. The problem is largely due to the fact that the world is entirely user created, and the majority of content created by users is made without any sort of basic graphical optimization. As a result, objects with both unnecessarily high polygon counts, and unnecessarily high resolution textures are prevalent. It is not uncommon for users to have to download and use upwards of a dozen times the amount of resources than would actually be required for the equivalent visual result. Certain areas have guidelines for script usage, which helps reduce lag by reducing resources used server-side, but does nothing to alleviate the primary issue above.

=== Congestion ===
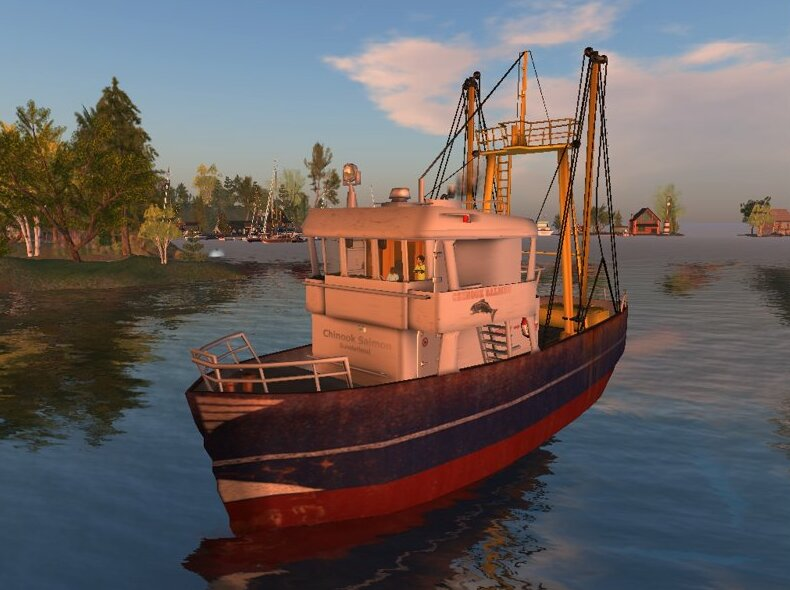
Fishing boat in Second Life

A single region (65,536 m^{2} of land hosted on a single CPU) is set to accommodate a limited number of Residents (40 on 'mainland' regions, up to 100 on private islands), causing some popular locations such as teleportation points to become inaccessible at times. It is possible for an area of land a Resident has paid for to become inaccessible because another area in the same region has exhausted the avatar limit.

=== Customer security ===
On September 8, 2006, Linden Lab released a news bulletin that revealed their Second Life database had been compromised and customer information, including encrypted passwords and users' real names, had likely been accessed. However, it was later revealed that the hacker had in fact been focused on trying to cheat the in-world money system and their access to personal information was believed incidental, although a full alert was still raised for safety's sake.

=== Fraud and intellectual property protection ===
Although Second Life's client and server incorporate digital rights management technology, the visual data of an object must ultimately be sent to the client for it to be drawn; thus unofficial third-party clients can bypass them. One such program, CopyBot, was developed in 2006 as a debugging tool to enable objects to be backed up, but was immediately hijacked for use in copying objects; additionally, programs that generally attack client-side processing of data, such as GLIntercept, can copy certain pieces of data. Such use is prohibited under the Second Life TOS and could be prosecuted under the Digital Millennium Copyright Act.

Linden Lab may ban a user who is observed using CopyBot or a similar client, but it will not ban a user simply for uploading or even selling copied content; in this case, Linden Lab's enforcement of intellectual property law is limited to that required by the "safe harbor" provisions of the DMCA which used to require a regular mail DMCA complaint. However, since 2019 an electronic DMCA complaint form is also available.

A few high-profile businesses in Second Life have filed such lawsuits, none of the cases filed to date have gone to trial, and most have been dismissed pursuant to a settlement agreement reached between the parties. Another case where settlement and dismissal was gained may be found in the matter of Eros, LLC v. Linden Research, Inc. As of October 7, 2010, the case was transferred to private mediation and the plaintiffs filed for dismissal of charges on March 15, 2011.

Most users in the world as paying, private individuals are, likewise, effectively unprotected. Common forms of fraud taking place in-world include bogus investment and pyramid schemes, fake or hacked vendors, and failure to honor land rental agreements. A group of virtual landowners online have filed a class action lawsuit against the company, claiming the company broke the law when it rescinded their ownership rights. The plaintiffs say a change in the terms of service forced them to either accept new terms that rescinded their virtual property ownership rights, or else be locked out of the site.

=== OpenSpaces ===
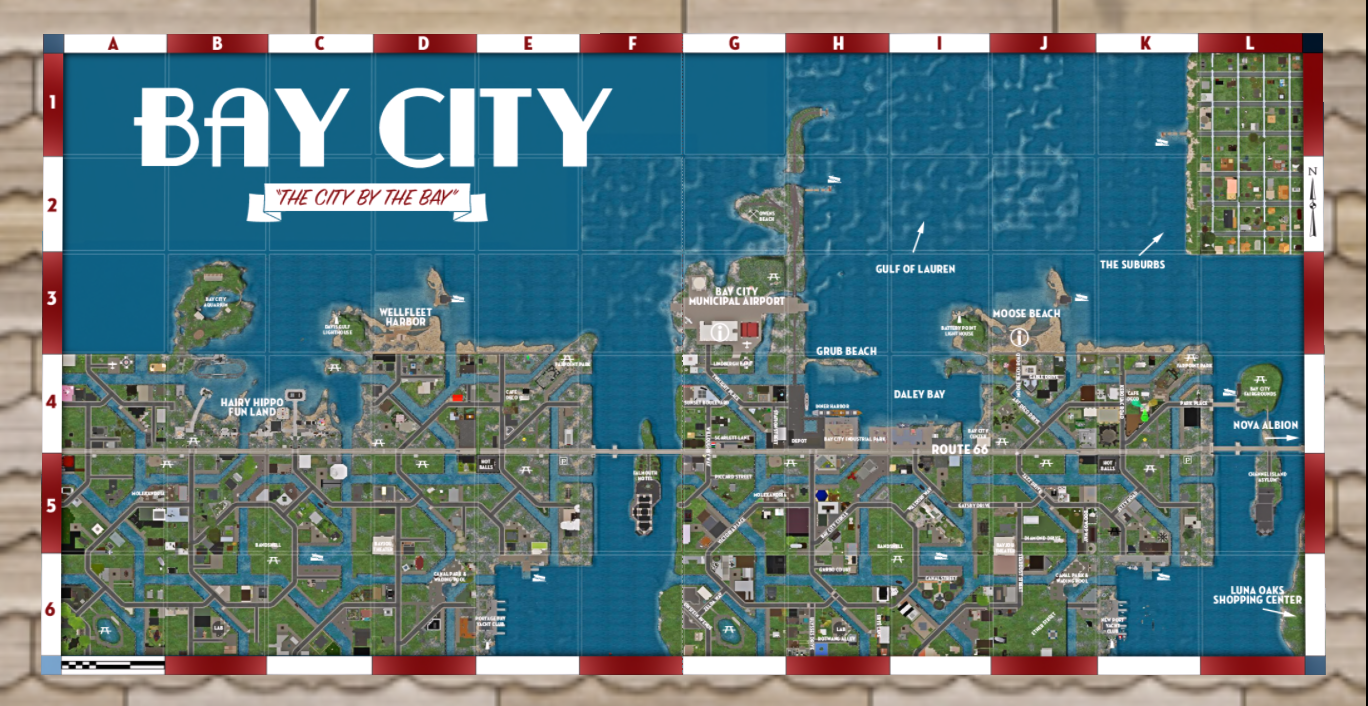
Map over Bay City, the largest virtual city of Second Life, located on the continent of Sansara

Linden Lab, for a period, offered Openspace regions to users: regions which were purchased in packs of four, with all four running on a single CPU core, intended to be placed next to an existing region to create the effect of larger size. The fee for 4 Openspaces was identical to that for a single private region. However, in March 2008, this rule was modified to permit Openspaces to be bought individually and placed elsewhere, and increasing the prim load each one could handle. Openspaces were made available for a US$415 downpayment plus a US$75 monthly fee.

In October 2008, Linden Lab announced that the Openspaces being used for this purpose were being misused; there was in fact no technical throttle limiting their usage. Linden Lab raised the monthly fee per Openspace to US$125, the same cost as half a region; added an avatar limit of 20; and renamed it to Homestead.

A week after the initial announcement Linden Lab stated its intention to add technical limits. A revised Openspace product, with far fewer prims, a no-residency rule, and costing the same monthly amount, was announced.

In May 2009, Linden Lab announced they were "grandfathering" Openspace sims (now rebranded as "Homesteads"), after a protracted protest movement caused a major amount of negative publicity and funded potential litigation.

=== Sex ===
Some media attention has been given to sexual activity involving avatars with a childlike appearance. The United Kingdom and Germany are among the countries investigating new laws to combat simulated child pornography. The USA has attempted to pass several laws forbidding simulated child pornography; however, each one has been struck down by the US Supreme Court as an infringement on the First Amendment right to free speech.

As of May 2007, two such countries, Germany and Belgium, have launched a police investigation into age of consent-related offenses in Second Life (including both trading of non-virtual photography and involuntary virtual sexual activity with childlike avatars by means of virtual identity theft). Linden Lab responded by issuing a statement that any "depiction of sexual or lewd acts involving minors" was a bannable offence.

In France, a conservative family union, Familles de France, sued Linden Lab in June 2007, alleging that Second Life gave minors access to sexual content, including bondage, zoophilia, scatophilia, and to gambling, and advertisements for alcohol, drugs and tobacco. Linden Lab pointed out that the virtual world is not meant for children (people under the age of 18) because of the mature content and interactions within Second Life. However, minors aged between 13 and 17 can access Second Life, but they will be restricted to what they can see or do based on age. The Second Life world is split into sections/worlds and each one is given a maturity rating similar to films: General, Moderate and Adult. Minors aged 13–17 can access areas with a General Rating only.

Second Life Main Grid regions are rated either "General", "Moderate", or "Adult" (previously "PG", "Mature", or "Adult"). Builds, textures, actions, animations, chat, or businesses that are of an adult nature are regulated by the Second Life Terms of Service to only occur in simulators with a Moderate or Adult rating. General rated sims exist as an alternative for residents who do not wish to reside in areas where adult-oriented activities and businesses are permitted.

Linden Lab has created an Adult rated "mainland" continent named Zindra in response to its other "mainland" continents being mostly General.

=== Unauthorized copying of content ===
Second Life features a built-in digital rights management system that controls the movement of textures, sounds, scripts, and models with the Second Life servers at Linden Lab. At some point, though, this data must be sent to a user's computer to be displayed or played, an issue fundamental to any system attempting to apply restrictions to digital information.

In November 2006, controversy arose over a tool called CopyBot, developed as part of libsecondlife and was intended to allow users to legitimately back up their Second Life data. For a brief period, an unmodified CopyBot allowed any user to replicate SL items or avatars (although not scripts, which run only on the servers at Linden Lab). Later changes to the SecondLife protocols prevented unmodified copies of CopyBot from working. Nevertheless, the basic issue of users being able to duplicate content that is sent to them remains.

Residents who copy content belonging to other users face being banned from Second Life, but Linden Lab has so far never sued any of these users for copyright infringement; since the resident creators (and not Linden Lab) retain ownership of the rights, it is not clear whether Linden Lab would legally be able to do so. Linden Lab does, however, comply with DMCA takedown notices served to them against resident content; serving a DMCA Takedown Notice is the normal procedure recommended by Linden Lab for having copyrighted content illegally resold on Second Life.

Any user who uploads, publishes, or submits any content keeps the intellectual property rights of that content, however, both Linden Lab and other users gain their own rights from your content. Linden Lab receives a content license from anything a user uploads to the server. Section 7.3 of the Second Life terms of service states; "you hereby automatically grant Linden Lab a non-exclusive, worldwide, royalty-free, sub-license able, and transferable licence to use, reproduce, distribute, prepare derivative works of, display, and perform the content solely for the purpose of providing and promoting the service".

A user who uploads their content to a public area also gives a content licence to other users as well, which allows other users to replicate and record for use in Machinima (as outlined in section 7.4, Snapshot and Machinima Policy).

Regardless of what rights and licences are given, Linden Lab takes no responsibility for the outcome of any dispute between users or the server regarding content. Section 10.2 states; "you release Linden Lab (and its officers, directors, shareholders, agents, subsidiaries, and employees) from claims, demands, losses, liabilities and damages (actual and consequential) of every kind nature, known and unknown, arising out of or in any way connected with any dispute you have or claim to have with one or more users, including whether or not Linden Lab becomes involved in any resolution or attempted resolution of the dispute". Section 10.3 repeats a similar passage but regarding the responsibility of Linden Lab during any data or technical fault.

== Litigation ==
=== Bragg v. Linden Lab ===
In 2006, attorney Marc Bragg sued Linden Lab, claiming that it had illegally deprived him of access to his account after he discovered a loophole in the online land auction system which allowed regions to be purchased at prices below reserve. Although most users and commentators believed that Bragg would have no chance of winning, a number of legal developments occurred as a result of the case, including a court ruling that parts of the Second Life Terms of Service were unenforceable, due to being an unconscionable contract of adhesion. The case eventually ended with Bragg's virtual land and account being restored to him in a confidential out-of-court settlement. Since the settlement created no legal precedent, it left users with confusion as to what legal rights they truly had with respect to their virtual land, items, and account. Many of Bragg's legal arguments rested on the claim, advertised on Linden Lab web site, that virtual land within Second Life could be "owned" by the purchasing user, which was removed shortly after the settlement.

=== Eros, LLC and Grei v. Linden Lab ===
Eros, LLC and Shannon Grei brought forth a class action suit in US District Court in Northern California against Linden Research, Inc on September 15, 2009 (Case4:09-cv-04269-PJH). Court papers allege the defendants knowingly and profitably turned a blind eye to copyright and trademark violations within the Second Life service.

=== Evans et al. v. Linden Lab ===
In 2010, a group of banned SL users filed suit against Linden Lab and CEO Philip Rosedale, in the same Pennsylvania Federal District Court that the Bragg case was adjudicated in, with the same judge, to deal with further land seizures and account suspensions by the Lab against various customers. Due to the Terms of Service agreement changes since the Bragg case, defendants attorneys successfully argued to move the suit to federal court in California, where the case lingered for several years. The judge did rule that there was a basis to turn the litigation into a class action, and that there were two classes under which claimants could file claims. The primary class was those who suffered economic damages to their livelihoods, through loss of their business revenues in SL. The secondary class was those who suffered property losses from loss of land, money on hand, and virtual goods in avatar inventories. In May 2013, attorney for defendants negotiated a settlement agreement with one of the lead attorneys that, in plain language, agreed to refund region setup fees for private island owners, pay land owners 2 Linden Dollars per square meter of virtual land, refund all L$ and USD amounts in the plaintiffs' accounts at the time of suspension, and allow the plaintiffs the option of either receiving $15US as compensation for loss of accounts and inventory virtual goods OR restoration of their accounts to sell their goods on the SL Marketplace. The settlement agreement went to final hearing in March 2014, with an objection from claimant Mike Lorrey as to the vagueness of certain terms in the settlement as to which fees exactly would be refunded. With the resolution of that objection, claimants who had filed claims prior to March 28, 2014, began to receive settlement money a few months later.

== In popular culture ==
Since its debut in 2003, Second Life has been referred to by various popular culture media, including literature, television, film and music. In addition, various personalities in such media have themselves used or employed Second Life for both their own works and for private purposes.

In September 2006, former Governor of Virginia Mark Warner became the first politician to appear in a MMO when he gave a speech in Second Life. Musicians followed suit, with Redzone being credited by Wired and Reuters as the first band to tour in Second Life in February 2007. Authors George R R Martin (May 2007) and Paul Levinson (November 2007) were interviewed in Second Life about their work. Then, in June 2008, author Charles Stross held a conference in Second Life to promote an upcoming novel. Second Life was also featured prominently, and used as a tool to locate a suspect, in the television show CSI: NY in 2007. In the American sitcom The Office, Dwight Schrute (Rainn Wilson) is known to play the game, most notably in the episode "Local Ad".

== Research ==
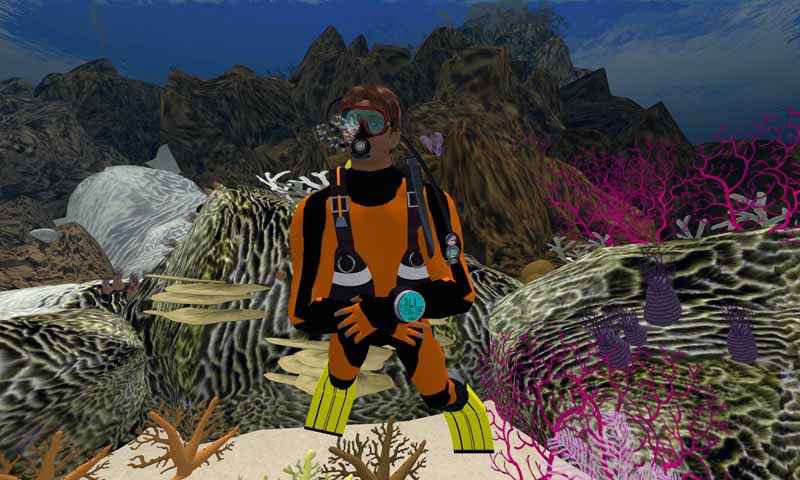
Scuba diver in NOAA's virtual coral sanctuary located in SciLands

Much of the published research conducted in Second Life is associated with education, learning, and data collection. Unlike computer games, Second Life does not have a pre-defined purpose and allows for highly realistic enactment of real life activities online. One such study tested the usefulness of SL as an action learning environment in a senior course for management information systems students. Another presented a case study in which university students were tasked with building an interactive learning experience using SL as a platform. Both problem-based learning and constructionism acted as framing pedagogies for the task, with students working in teams to design and build a learning experience which could be possible in real life.

Situated learning has also been examined in SL, to determine how the design and social dynamics of the virtual world support and constrain various types of learning. The paper, "The future for (second) life and learning", published in the British Journal of Educational Technology, examines the potential of Second Life to further innovative learning techniques. It notes trends within the SL innovation to date, including the provision of realistic settings, the exploitation of pleasant simulated environments for groups, and the links with other learning technologies. It also considers the creativity sparked by SL's potential to offer the illusion of 3-D 'spaces' and buildings, and points to infinite imaginative educational possibilities.

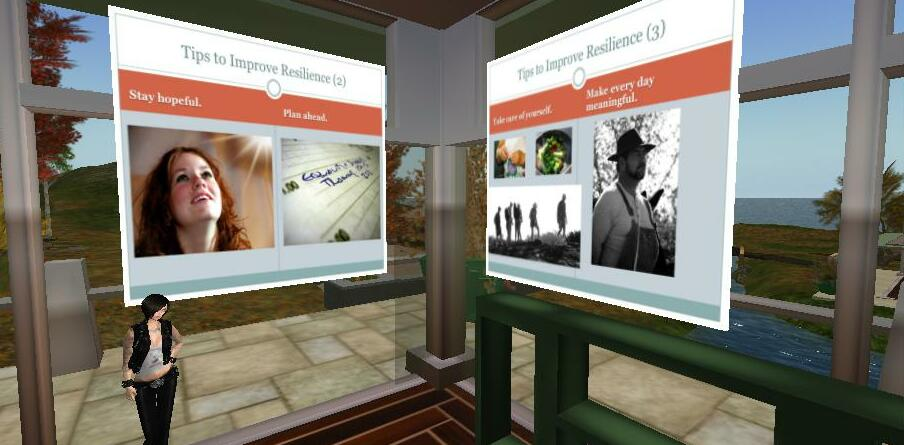
HealthInfo Island provides tips on staying healthy to Second Life residents.

Second Life has also offered educational research potential within the medical and healthcare fields. Examples include in-world research facilities such as the Second Life Medical and Consumer Health Libraries (Healthinfo Island, funded by a grant from the US National Library of Medicine), and VNEC (Virtual Neurological Education Centre, developed at the University of Plymouth, UK).

There have also been healthcare related studies done of SL residents. Studies show that behaviors from virtual worlds can translate to the real world. One survey suggests that users are engaged in a range of health-related activities in SL which are potentially impacting real-life behaviors.

Another focus of SL research has included the relationship of avatars or virtual personas to the 'real' or actual person. These studies have included research into social behavior and reported two main implications. The first is that SL virtual selves shape users' offline attitudes and behavior. The research indicated that virtual lives and physical lives are not independent, and our appearances and actions have both online and offline consequences. The second deals with experimental research and supports the idea that virtual environments, such as SL, can enable research programs in that people behave in a relatively natural spread of behavioral patterns. Remote data collection in SL must account for issues related to research participant engagement, burden, retention, and accuracy of data collected.

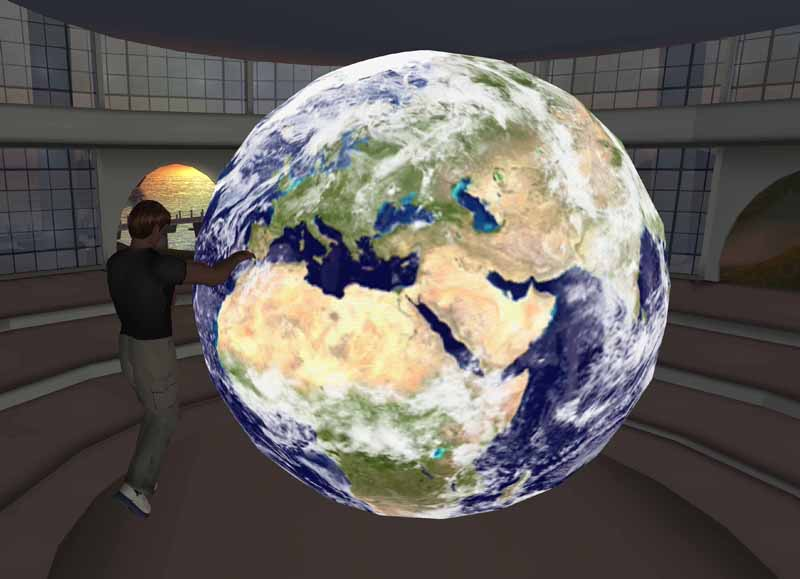
A realistic depiction of Earth as shown in the virtual world of Second Life at SciLands

The SL avatar-self relationship was also studied via resident interviews, and various enactments of the avatar-self relationship were identified. The study concluded that SL residents enacted multiple avatar-self relationships and cycled through them in quick succession, suggesting that these avatar-self relationships might be shaped and activated strategically to achieve the desired educational, commercial, or therapeutic outcomes.

Anthropologist Tom Boellstorff describes the anthropological applications of studying Second Life and its userbase in Coming of Age in Second Life: An Anthropologist Explores the Virtually Human. Boellstorff explores the relationship between anonymity and community when everyone in a community belongs to varying degrees of anonymity, and how this feeds into the idea of digital collectivity. He also comments on the phenomenon of data becoming "part of social context" that has been observed both inside and outside of Second Life as surveillance becomes more integrated into everyday life. He stresses the difference between the concepts of anonymity and pseudonymity, identifying Second Life users as belonging to the latter group of people – though their avatars are not directly linked to their real identities and reputations, they have forged new ones in this online space, a unique effect of creating an online persona in the digital age.

== See also ==
- Libraries in virtual worlds#Second Life libraries
- Simulated reality
- Social simulation game
- Virtual reality
- Metaverse
