= Douglas Merrill =

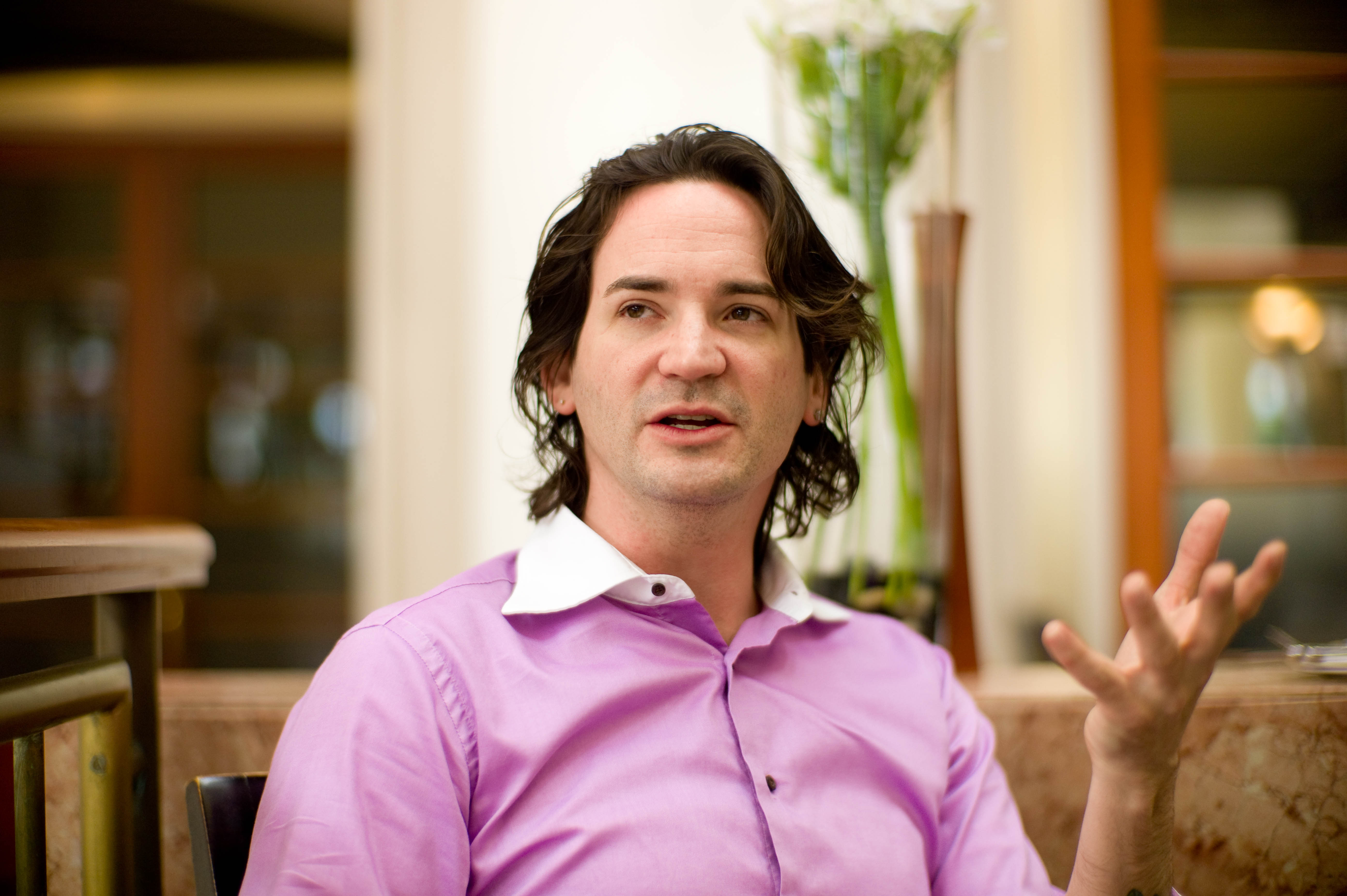
- Douglas Merrill
- Born: 1970 (age 55–56)
- Education: University of Tulsa; Princeton University
- Scientific career
- Workplaces: RAND Corporation; Google
- Thesis: Facilitating the development of problem-solving skills with reasoning-congruent learning environments (1994)
- Doctoral advisor: Brian J. Reiser
- Website: www.douglascmerrill.com

Douglas Clark Merrill (born 1970) is an American technologist, academic and fintech entrepreneur. Merrill was Chief Information Officer (CIO) at Google from 2003-2008, and served as president of EMI Music's digital unit from 2008-2009.

== Early life and education ==
Merrill grew up in Arkansas and graduated from the University of Tulsa, majoring in social and political organization. He then attended Princeton University, where he received master's and doctoral degrees in cognitive science.

== Career ==
Previously, Merrill was CIO at Google from 2003-2008, and served as president of EMI Music's digital unit from 2008-2009. In March 2010, Merrill published the book, Getting Organized in the Google Era: How to Get Stuff Out of Your Head, Find It When You Need It, and Get It Done Right. Merrill is also a former researcher with the RAND Corporation and is listed among the organization's participants.

Previously, Merrill was the CEO and founder of Zest AI (formerly Zest Finance) until 2019, a Los Angeles-based financial services technology company that uses machine learning and data science to help companies make more accurate credit decisions. The company announced a $19 million round of Series A funding in July 2011, and a $28 million round of Series B funding in January 2012. The company was one of Forbes’ Names You Need to Know in 2011 and a member of the Forbes Fintech 50 in 2015 and 2016.

Merrill is a Partner at McKinsey & Company, based in Los Angeles.

== Publications ==
Merrill has contributed to business publications including Fast Company and Forbes, where he writes on innovation and culture, and how the two coincide. He also speaks regularly on innovation, reforming the U.S. financial system, and how credit providers can harness technological advances to change the way creditworthiness and risk are determined.

His academic publications include articles in The Journal of the Learning Sciences, Cognition and Instruction, Reliable Distributed Systems, and a paper in the book series Lecture Notes in Computer Science. He sat on the board of The Filter, a company developing recommendation filters for search engines. He holds patents in machine learning, machine learning in credit underwriting, and machine learning model fairness.
