= Economy of Second Life =

Economy in the online video game

The online video game Second Life has its own economy and a virtual token referred to as Linden Dollars (L$). In the SL economy, users (called "residents") buy from and sell to one another directly, using the Linden, which is a closed-loop virtual token for use only within the Second Life platform. Linden Dollars have no monetary value and are not redeemable for monetary value from Linden Lab. However, the presence of a currency exchange has led to the Linden Dollar being recognised as a centralized virtual currency, a fiat currency, or property. A resident with a surplus of Linden Dollars earned via a Second Life business or experiential play can offer to exchange with other users via the LindeX exchange provided by Linden Lab. This economy is independent of the price of the game, which users pay to Linden Lab, not to each other. Linden Lab reported that the Second Life economy generated US$3,596,674 in economic activity during the month of September 2005, and in September 2006, Second Life was reported to have a GDP of US$64,000,000.

In 2009, the total size of the Second Life economy grew 65% to US$567 million, about 25% of the entire U.S. virtual goods market. Gross Resident Earnings are $55 million US Dollars in 2009 – 11% growth over 2008.

== Basis ==
The basis of this economy is that residents (that is, users, as opposed to Linden Lab) can buy and sell services and virtual goods to one another in a free market. Services include camping, working in stores, custom content creation, and other services. Virtual goods include buildings, vehicles, devices of all kinds, animations, clothing, skin, hair, jewelry, flora and fauna, works of art, and breedable in-game animals and pets such as: foxes, turtles, horses, cats, dogs, fish, dragons, and original in-game pets called Meeroos. To earn Linden Dollars in Second Life, one must find customers who are willing to pay for the services or products that one can supply, just like in real life.

Because of the existence of virtual land, there is an active virtual real estate market. Originally, all land comes from Linden Lab (which is part of the pricing and a revenue stream for them), but after that, it is bought and sold much like real-life real estate. Mainstream media has reported on SL residents who earn large incomes from the SL real estate market.

In addition to the main economy, some residents receive a small weekly stipend, depending on the kind of account they have, and when they joined Second Life. There are also the virtual equivalent of minimum wage jobs and charitable organizations that try to introduce new residents to the consumer economy.

== LindeX currency exchange ==
Residents may purchase L$ directly through the Second Life viewer, or by logging into the website and using the Lindex Exchange. The ratio of L$ to US$ (L$:US$) is a floating exchange rate depending on supply and demand; Linden Dollars can be purchased and sold on the Lindex at the current market rate, or residents can set their own limit to get a better exchange rate. However, limit orders may take longer to be fulfilled than market rates.

Between June 2008 and June 2017, the rate has remained stable with a high of L$270/US$1 and a low of L$240/US$1.

== Bitcoin Exchange ==
Between 2011 and 2013, a third party exchange, Virwox, allowed trading between Linden dollars and bitcoin. This led to concerns about whether the Linden dollar should fall under anti money laundering legislation, which led to the closure of such third party exchanges.

== Economic issues ==
=== Government ===
Second Life residents mostly do not have a government. In part, this is enabled by the fact that there is also no physical damage, and in principle no possible theft of property (excluding virtual content), nor is there war on a large scale, other than between military groups or other role players restricted to "damage-enabled" sims like Eridanus and other similar areas. Thus, many of the functions of government are not required.

On the other hand, there is always a need for dispute resolution.

At the lowest level, property rights reign supreme. A building's owner makes the rules, and can simply eject or ban any resident they wish to, with or without cause. An owner of 512 square meters is lord of that manor, just as the so-called land barons are the lords of their much larger ones.

Some groups of people in Second Life have created small-scale political structures. For example, they might band together, purchase property in the group's name, and agree to follow in-group rules and regulations, elect officers, support a monarchy, etc.

At the highest level, Linden Lab is the true owner of Second Life, and within the Second Life Terms of Service (TOS), they are the ultimate authority.

=== Monetary policy ===
For a historical perspective on Linden Lab monetary policy, two articles posted in 2007 and 2008 by the Ludwig von Mises Institute demonstrate how the Linden Dollar concept captured the imagination of economists and philosophers. While not an actual currency, the Linden Dollar's function within the Second Life virtual world allowed many thinkers to draw interesting parallels between the Linden Dollar token/the Second Life economy and real-world currencies/economies.

Any up-to-date information about Second Life's monetary policy can be found within Second Life's Terms of Service.

=== Acts of Linden ===
Linden Lab, as the actual owner of all the software and server-side hardware that makes up Second Life, has the ultimate authority to change all aspects of the world, from the economy to the physics to the terms-of-service.

Changes made or proposed by Linden Lab are thus far-reaching and can lead to unexpected results. Some changes have created new markets, but also have on occasion destroyed or removed the value of existing ones, or inadvertently given a market leader at a particular time unique advantages that entrench them as a market leader in the future.

One example is InfoNet, an in-world newspaper and information delivery service run on a for-profit basis, and formerly of limited effectiveness due to a limited range of access points (true of many such systems in SL). When the old concept of "telehubs" was removed from the game, Linden Lab replaced them with "InfoHubs", each of which included an InfoNet access point which was hosted for free on system-owned land; it also placed InfoNet access points in the Welcome Areas where new users arrive, where no user is normally permitted to leave business-related objects. This gave InfoNet an instant and substantial advantage.

Linden Acts of greater economic import include the banning of wagering on games of random chance or on real-life sporting events with L$. Gaming region owners and game scripters either found other avenues of business or ceased operations. The fallout of this was the largest Linden Dollar bank in SL, Ginko Financial, which had its Linden Dollar ATMs in most major gaming regions, saw its reserves drained completely within hours, and was never able to catch up with Linden Dollar withdrawal requests, which eventually amounted to L$55 million out of deposits of L$180 million. Ginko's assets were primarily invested in either things of poor to no liquidity, or virtual securities that were then trading at significantly under their purchase price.

In the second quarter of 2008, Linden Lab increased the amount of land it supplied daily, which lowered prices "from a bottom of 8.5 lindens to 7.5 lindens a meter overnight."

Shortly after these events, Linden Lab began collecting the value-added tax (VAT) from customers who live in the European Union (aside from those customers who have a VAT ID which exempts them from the tax). This is applied to membership, land purchase, and land maintenance fees paid in real world currency (e.g., the euro) by European members to Linden Lab. Previously, Linden Lab had absorbed the cost of the VAT. Linden Lab did not attempt to collect any VAT which might theoretically be applicable to Linden $ transactions between individual Second Life residents. When VAT charging on fees began, there was discussion among Europeans about leaving SL, or else transferring their lands to American partners, or getting into lines of work that do not involve fees paid to Linden Lab in euros. American land barons were in a position to offer tax shelters to Europeans (although in theory the European users could still owe VAT on cash transfers to or from their US partners.)

=== Linden Economy Factors ===
Because some business models rely on a revenue model existing outside Second Life, some businesses may affect the traditional approach to Second Life business and the general Second Life economy. For example, the SLIPPcat advertising system encourages companies to provide content in Second Life which can not only be obtained for free but which generates income for its owner by displaying advertisements to other users when clicked.

SL businesses are especially vulnerable to business disruption due to the zero marginal cost of production. In 2007, Anshe Chung was criticised for marketing a line of furniture in which every item was sold for 10 Linden dollars (approximately 4 cents.) Selling such items was viable for Anshe because the majority of her income came from the sale and maintenance of land, used to host houses within which the furniture was placed; but posed a threat to furniture makers as such low prices would make it impossible for stores not supported by an auxiliary business to compete.

In November 2009, Linden Lab announced that it was considering charging a L$99/month per-item fee for listing "freebies" (free items) on XStreetSL, its e-commerce website, which previously could be exchanged for free on the site. It also announced XStreetSL would charge higher commissions for non-freebies, along with an L$10/month per-item fee for such items. This was seen by the user community as a ploy to minimize the number of free and low-priced items on the site.

The low cost of business in SL allows unprofitable business models to be sustained at a lower real world cost than would be possible for the same business in real life.
