= Linden (surname) =

Linden is a surname commonly of Dutch, English and German origin. For the Swedish surname, see Lindén.

Notable people with the surname include:

- Alan Linden (1917–1956), Australian football player
- Allen Linden (1934–2017), Canadian jurist
- Andreas Linden (b. 1965), German javelin thrower
- Andy Linden (actor) (fl. 1990s–present), British actor
- Andy Linden (racing driver) (1922–1987), American racecar driver
- Anya Linden (b. 1933), British ballerina
- Bob Linden (fl. 2000s–present), American radio personality and entrepreneur
- Colin Linden (b. 1960), Canadian musician
- David Linden (politician) (b. 1990), Scottish politician
- David J. Linden (b. 1961), American neuroscientist and author
- Debbie Linden (1961–1997), British model and actress
- Donald Linden (1885–1965), Canadian athlete in Olympic walking
- Eddie Linden (1935–2023), Scottish-Irish poet and magazine editor
- Edward Linden (1891–1956), American cinematographer
- Eric Linden (1909–1994), American actor
- Errol Linden (1937–1983), American football player
- Eugene Linden (author) (fl. 1980s-present), American author of technical and scientific books
- Eugene Linden (conductor) (f. 1930s), American musical conductor
- Hal Linden (b. 1931), American actor
- Jaap ter Linden (b. 1947), Dutch musician and conductor
- James Linden (fl. 1920s), American football coach
- Jamie Linden (ice hockey) (b. 1972), Canadian athlete in ice hockey
- Jamie Linden (writer) (b. 1980), American screenwriter
- Jean Jules Linden (1817–1898), Belgian botanist and explorer, father of Lucien
- Jennie Linden (b. 1939), English actress
- Joannes Antonides van der Linden, Dutch physician, botanist, author, and librarian
- Jordan Linden (b. 1995 or 1996), Scottish former politician
- Jürgen Linden (b. 1947), German politician
- Kathy Linden (fl. 1950s), American singer of popular music
- Louise Linden (1862–1934), American saxophonist
- Lucien Linden (1851–1940), Belgian botanist, son of Jean Jules
- Marta Linden (1903–1990), American actress
- Michael Linden (b. 1948), German neurologist and professor of psychiatry
- Mickey Linden (fl. 1980–2000), Irish Gaelic footballer
- Paddy Linden (b. 1954/1955), Irish Gaelic footballer
- Sophie Linden (b. 1970), British politician
- Stella Linden (1919–2005), British-born British and American actress and playwright
- Todd Linden (b. 1980), American baseball player
- Trevor Linden (b. 1970), Canadian ice hockey player
- Wolfgang Linden, clinical psychologist

== See also ==
- Linden (given name)
- Linden (disambiguation)
- Van der Linden, surname
- Van der Linde, surname
- Linnaeus (disambiguation)
