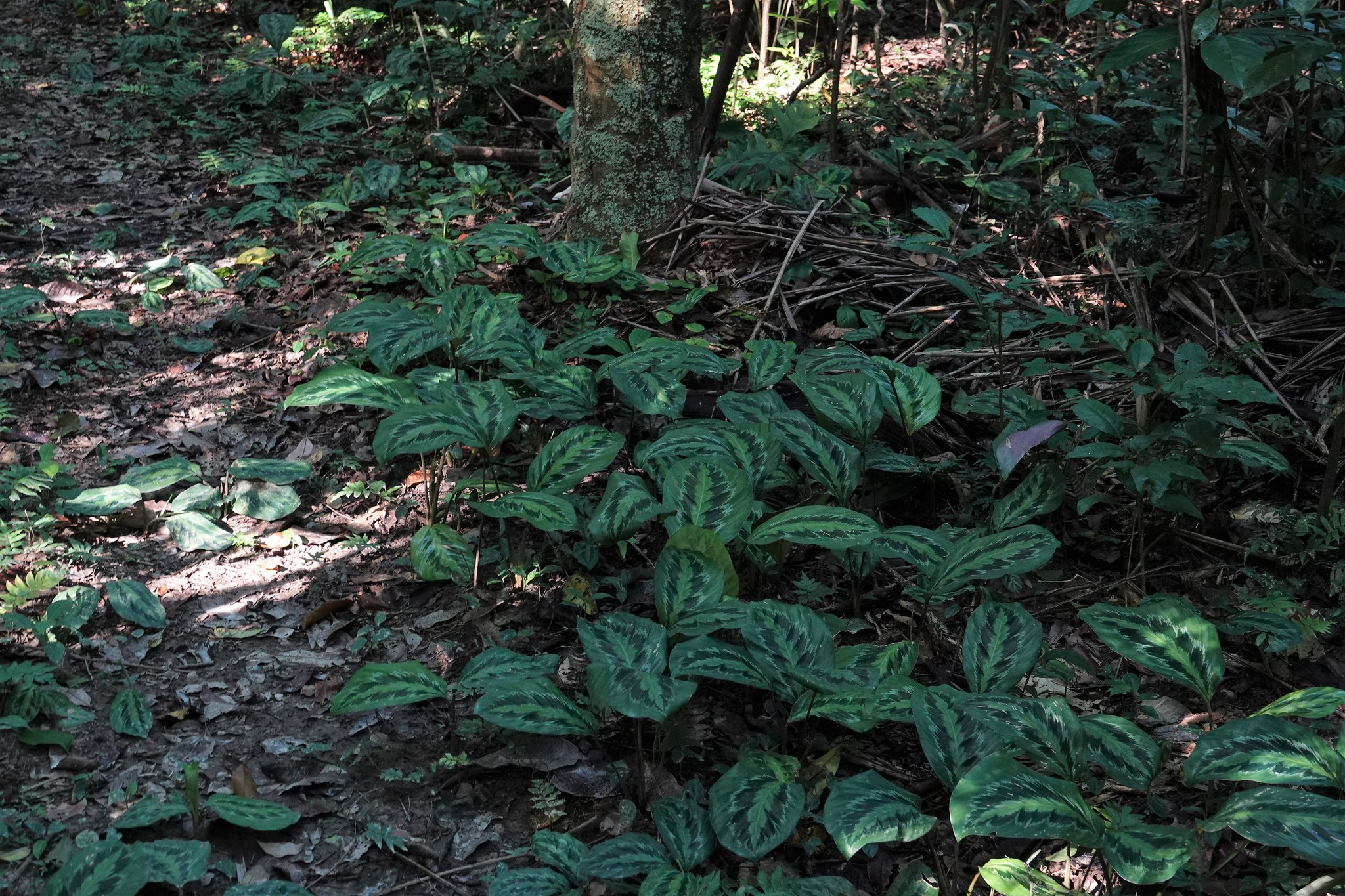

Scientific classification
- Kingdom: Plantae
- Clade: Embryophytes
- Clade: Tracheophytes
- Clade: Angiosperms
- Clade: Monocots
- Clade: Commelinids
- Order: Zingiberales
- Family: Marantaceae
- Genus: Goeppertia
- Species: G. legrelleana

Binomial name
- Goeppertia legrelleana (Linden) Borchs. & S.Suárez

Synonyms
- Calathea legrelleana (Linden) Regel; Maranta legrelleana Linden; Phyllodes legrelleana (Linden) Kuntze

= Goeppertia legrelleana =

Species of flowering plant

Goeppertia legrelleana is a species of the genus Goeppertia, in the family Marantaceae. It is native to Colombia, Ecuador, French Guiana, Guyana, Peru and Suriname. It was first discovered by Linden in 1867 and described as Maranta legrelleana in Ann. Hort. Belge Étrangère.

== Description ==
Goeppertia legrelleana is a medium sized species with wide ovale green leaves with long, green petioles and a short, green pulvinus. It has a pattern on the upper side of the leaf with one, silvery green band along the middle vein and two broad, dark green bands on each side of the middle band. This pattern is easily confused with Goeppertia metallica or Goeppertia chimboracensis. The side under the leaf is often grey or green with a soft purple blush. The inflorescence of G. legrelleana is made of multiple small bracts in a pencil shape, similar to Goeppertia picturata or Goeppertia metallica. The bracts are green and hairy and the flowers are white with a soft purple blush on the three staminodes.

== Cultivation ==
It has recently been introduced in cultivation and can sometimes be found in plant nurseries.
