= Lindy (name) =

Lindy is a unisex given name and a nickname. As a female given name, it is a variant of names like Linda, Belinda, and Melinda, and the meaning of Lindy is "beautiful; pretty; sweet." As a male name, it is a variant of names such as Lindsay and Lyndon, and the meaning is "linden tree mountain; Lincoln's marsh; island of linden trees; linden tree hill."

Lindy was most popular in the year 1979, when it ranked 586th.

== People ==
=== Given name ===
==== Women ====
- Lindy Booth (born 1979), Canadian actress
- Lyndy or Lindy Brill (born 1963), British actress and singer
- Lindy Burns, Australian presenter
- Lindy Davies (born 1946), Australian actress, director and drama teacher
- Lindy DeKoven, American television executive
- Lindy Elkins-Tanton, American planetary scientist
- Lindy Hamilton-Temple-Blackwood (1941–2020), British artist, conservationist and businesswoman
- Lindy Hemming (born 1948), Welsh Oscar-winning costume designer
- Lindy Hou (born 1960), Australian tandem cyclist and triathlete
- Lindy Kelly (born 1952), New Zealand writer
- Lindy Leveau-Agricole (born 1978), Seychellois javelin thrower
- Lindy Robbins, American songwriter
- Lindy Rodwell (born 1962), South African zoologist and conservationist
- Lindy Vivas (fl. 1979–1992), American former volleyball player and coach
- Lindy Vopnfjörð (born 1972), Canadian singer-songwriter
- Lindy West (born 1982), American writer, feminist and editor
- Lindy Melissa Wiik (born 1985), Norwegian footballer
- Lindy Wilson, South African politician

==== Men ====
- Lindy Berry (1927–2014), American college football and Canadian Football League quarterback
- Lindy Fralin, American guitar pickup manufacturer
- Lindy Kasperski (1950–2014), Canadian politician
- Lindy Miller (born 1956), American professional golfer
- Lindy Pearson (1929–2011), American National Football League player
- Lindy Remigino (1931–2018), American sprinter, 1952 Olympic 100 m champion
- Lindy Ruff (born 1960), Canadian National Hockey League coach and former player

=== Nickname ===
==== Women ====
- Lindy Boggs (1916–2013), American politician
- Lindy Chamberlain-Creighton (born 1948), Australian wrongly convicted of murdering her daughter
- Lindy Cochran (born 1953), American alpine skier
- Lindy Jenkins (born 1959), a justice with the Supreme Court of Western Australia appointed in 2004
- Lindy Layton (born 1970), British singer
- Lindy Morrison (born 1951), Australian rock drummer
- Lindy Nelson-Carr (born 1952), Australian former politician

==== Men ====
- Lindy Delapenha (1927–2017), Jamaican footballer and sports journalist
- Lindy Hood (1907–1972), American college basketball player
- Lindy Infante (1940–2015), American football player and coach
- Lindy McDaniel (1935–2020), American Major League Baseball relief pitcher
- Lucky Lindy Charles Lindbergh (1902–1974) American aviator, military officer, author, inventor, and activist

== Fictional characters ==
- Lindy, from Alex Flinn's novel Beastly and the film of the same name
- Lindy Karsten, from CrossGen Entertainment's Sigilverse
- Lindy, a fairy character from Noddy in Toyland
- Lindy Sampson, the protagonist in R. L. Stine's novel Eye Candy and main character in the hit MTV television series Eye Candy
- Lindy Watson, from Disney Channel's I Didn't Do It
- Lindy Lisson, wife of megachurch pastor, Lyle Lissons in The Righteous Gemstones
