= Thomas Aspinwall Davis House =

Historic house in Massachusetts, United States

- U.S. National Register of Historic Places
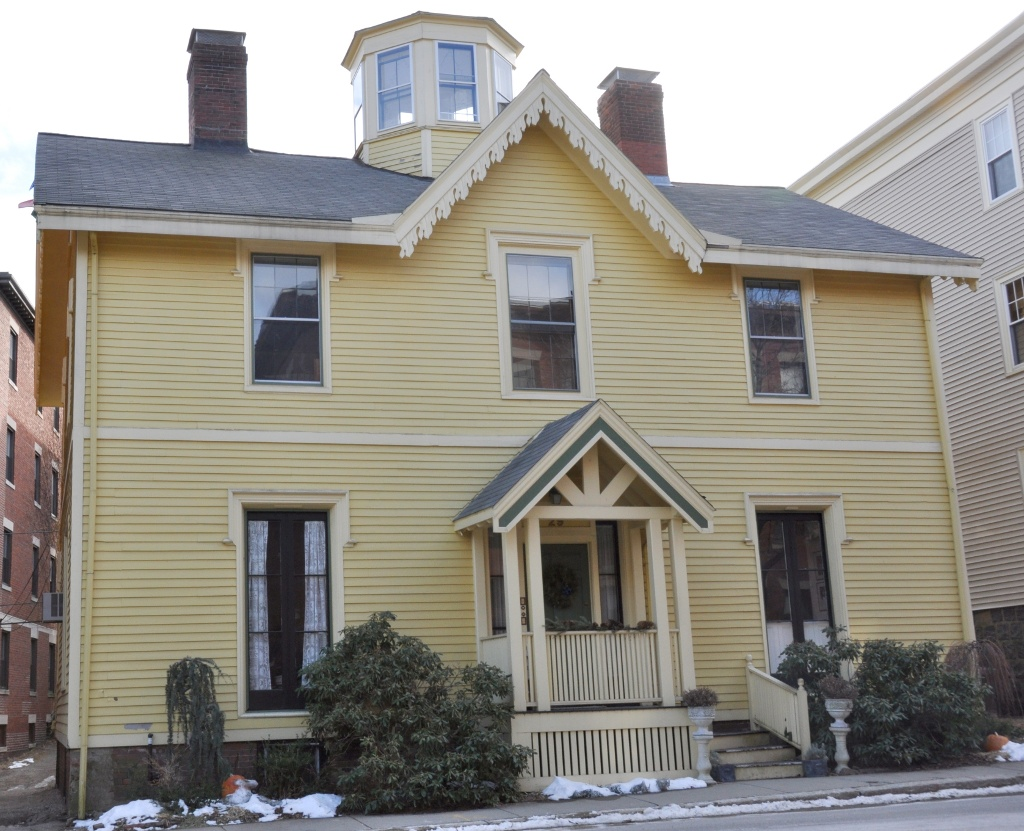

- Location within Massachusetts
- Location: 29 Linden Place, Brookline, Massachusetts
- Coordinates: 42°20′6″N 71°7′2.12″W
- Area: less than one acre
- Built: 1844
- Architectural style: Gothic Revival
- MPS: Brookline MRA
- NRHP reference No.: 85003260
- Added to NRHP: October 17, 1985

The Thomas Aspinwall Davis House is a historic house at 29 Linden Place in Brookline, Massachusetts. The house was built in 1844, by Thomas Aspinwall Davis, later a mayor of Boston, and is one of the earliest buildings to survive from his Linden Park project, the first residential subdivision in Brookline. The house was listed on the National Register of Historic Places in 1985.

== Description and history ==
The Thomas Aspinwall Davis House stands in Brookline's Linden Park residential neighborhood, east of Brookline Village, on the south side of Linden Place nearly opposite Linden Square. It is a 2 1/2-story wood-frame structure, with a gabled roof and clapboarded exterior. The house is predominantly Italianate in style, with three bays across, hooded front windows, and a cupola. The central front gable is decorated with Gothic bargeboard, and the building supposedly had a more ornately decorated porch before its move in 1903.

The Davis family had for a long time been landowners in this area of Brookline. In 1843, Thomas Aspinwall Davis took the area surrounding what is now Linden Park and Linden Square, and worked with landscape designer Alexander Wadsworth to lay out the two small parks and house lots. The house lots, auctioned in 1843 and 1844, became Brookline's first residential subdivision. Davis built this house in 1843, originally facing Linden Park. It was moved in 1903 to its present orientation facing Linden Place.

== See also ==
- National Register of Historic Places listings in Brookline, Massachusetts
