= Linden =

Linden may refer to:

== Trees ==
- Tilia (also known as lime or basswood), a genus
  - American linden, a common name for Tilia americana
  - Large-leaved linden, a common name for Tilia platyphyllos
  - Little-leaf linden, a common name for Tilia cordata
  - Silver linden, a common name for Tilia tomentosa
- Viburnum linden, a common name for Viburnum dilatatum

== Places ==
=== Australia ===
- Linden, New South Wales, a village in the Blue Mountains
- Linden, Queensland, a rural locality
- Linden, Western Australia, a ghost town in the goldfields of Western Australia

=== Canada ===
- Linden, Alberta, a village
- Linden, Nova Scotia

=== Germany ===
- Linden, Hanover, a quarter in the district of Hanover, Lower Saxony
- Linden, Hesse, a town in the district of Gießen, Hessen
- Linden, Kaiserslautern, a municipality in the district of Kaiserslautern, Rhineland-Palatinate
- Linden, Schleswig-Holstein, a municipality in the district Dithmarschen, Schleswig-Holstein
- Linden, Westerwaldkreis, a municipality in the district Westerwaldkreis, Rhineland-Palatinate
- Unter den Linden, a boulevard in Berlin

=== United States ===
- Linden, Alabama, a city and county seat
- Linden, Arizona, an unincorporated community
- Linden, California, a census-designated place
- Linden, Idaho, an unincorporated community
- Linden, Indiana, a town
- Linden, Iowa, a city
- Linden, Michigan, a city
- Linden Township, Brown County, Minnesota
- Linden, Minnesota, an unincorporated community
- Linden, Atchison County, Missouri, an unincorporated community
- Linden, Christian County, Missouri, an unincorporated community
- Linden, New Jersey, a city
- Linden, North Carolina, a town
- Linden (Columbus, Ohio), a neighborhood in Columbus
- Linden, Pennsylvania, a village in Woodward Township, Lycoming County, Pennsylvania
- Linden, Tennessee, a town and county seat
- Linden, Texas, a city and county seat
- Linden, Virginia, an unincorporated community
- Linden, Wise County, Virginia, an unincorporated community
- Linden, West Virginia, an unincorporated community
- Linden (town), Wisconsin, a town
  - Linden, Wisconsin, a village within the town

=== Elsewhere ===
- Linden, Belgium, a town in the municipality of Lubbeek, Flemish Brabant
- Linden, Guyana, the second largest city in Guyana
- Linden, Netherlands, a village in North Brabant
- Linden, New Zealand, a suburb of Wellington
- Linden, Gauteng, a suburb of Johannesburg
- Linden, Switzerland, a municipality in the canton of Bern

== Historic houses ==
- Linden (Glen Allan, Mississippi)
- Linden (Natchez, Mississippi)
- Linden (Champlain, Virginia)
- Linden Place, Bristol, Rhode Island
- Linden (Dunedin), New Zealand

== People ==
- Linden (given name)
- Linden (surname)
- Lindén, a Swedish surname

== Ships ==
- USS Linden, a Union Navy steamer which served in the American Civil War
- ST Linden, a Kenyan tugboat

== Transportation ==
=== United States ===
- Linden (CTA), a rapid transit station in Wilmette, Illinois
- Linden Depot, a historic railroad station in Linden, Indiana, on the National Register of Historic Places
- Linden Airport, a general aviation airport near Linden, New Jersey
- Linden station (NJ Transit), a commuter rail station in Linden, New Jersey
- Linden Circle, a traffic circle in Linden, New Jersey
- Linden Boulevard, in the boroughs of Brooklyn and Queens in New York City, New York

=== Elsewhere ===
- Linden railway station, New South Wales, Australia
- Linden railway station, Wellington, New Zealand

== Other uses ==
- Linden High School (disambiguation)
- Linden Lab, creators of the online virtual world Second Life
- Linden Dollar, the virtual currency used in Second Life

== See also ==
- Lin Dan (born 1983), Chinese badminton player
- Linden Hall (disambiguation)
- Linden House (disambiguation)
- Linden Lodge School, London
- Linden Oak, a white oak in Bethesda, Maryland
- Linden Park (disambiguation), several places
- Linden Square, a historic place in Brookline, Massachusetts
- Lindon (disambiguation)
- Lynden (disambiguation)
- Lyndon (disambiguation)
- The Lindens (disambiguation)
