= Lyndon =

Lyndon may refer to:

== Places ==
- Lyndon, Alberta, Canada
- Lyndon, Rutland, East Midlands, England
- Lyndon, Solihull, West Midlands, England

=== United States ===
- Lyndon, Illinois, a village
- Lyndon, Kansas, a city
- Lyndon, Kentucky, a city
- Lyndon, New York, a town
- Lyndon, Ohio, an unincorporated community
- Lyndon, Pennsylvania, an unincorporated community
- Lyndon, Vermont, a town
- Lyndon, Sheboygan County, Wisconsin, a town
- Lyndon, Juneau County, Wisconsin, a town

== Other uses ==
- Lyndon State College, a public college located in Lyndonville, Vermont

== People ==
- Lyndon (name), given name and surname

== See also ==
- Lyndon School (disambiguation)
- Lyndon Township (disambiguation)
- Lydon (disambiguation)
- Lynden (disambiguation)
- Lindon (disambiguation)
- Linden (disambiguation)
