= EWT =

Ewt or EWT may refer to:

== Non-profit organisations ==
- Endangered Wildlife Trust, South Africa
- Essex Wildlife Trust, England

== Other uses ==
- Eastern War Time, a defunct U.S. time zone
- Electroweak theory, in particle physics
- Newt (ewt in Middle English), an animal
- iShares MSCI Taiwan ETF, NYSE Arca stock ticker symbol EWT
