= Lyndon (name) =

Lyndon is a given name and surname.

== Notable people with this given name ==
- Lyndon Amick (born 1977), American racing driver
- Lyndon Andrews (born 1976), Trinidad and Tobago footballer
- Lyndon Antoine (born 1986), Grenadian footballer
- Lyndon Buckingham (born 1962), 22nd General of the Salvation Army
- Lyndon Byers (born 1964), Canadian ice hockey player
- Lyndon Brook (1926–2004), British actor
- Lyndon Campos (born 1966), Brazilian hurdler
- Lyndon Carlson (born 1940), American politician
- Lyndon Dunshea (born 1991), New Zealand rugby union player
- Lyndon Dykes (born 1995), Australian footballer
- Lyndon Emsley (born 1964), British chemist
- Lyndon Lyn Evans (born 1945), Welsh physicist
- Lyndon Evelyn (1759–1839), British Member of Parliament
- Lyndon Farnham, Jersey businessman and politician
- Lyndon Ferns (born 1983), South African swimmer
- Lyndon Hannibal (born 1965), Sri Lankan cricketer
- Lyndon Hardy, American physicist and author
- Lyndon Hooper (born 1966), Canadian soccer player and coach
- Lyndon Jackson, Micronesian politician
- Lyndon James (born 1998), English cricketer
- Lyndon B. Johnson (1908–1973), thirty-sixth President of the United States
- Lyndon Johnson (American football) (born 1994), American football player
- Lyndon Jones (cricketer) (born 1976), Welsh cricketer
- Lyndon LaRouche (1922–2019), American economist, philosopher, and political activist
- Lyndon Lawless (born 1945), American musician and music educator
- Lyndon Lea (born 1969), English financier and investor
- Lyndon Loos (born 1996), Sri Lankan cricketer
- Lyndon Andy McMillan (born 1968), South African footballer and coach
- Lyndon Menegon (born 1948), Australian cricketer
- Lyndon Henry Morris (1889–1946), British chief constable
- Lyndon Mustoe (born 1969), Welsh rugby union player
- Lyndon Needs, Welsh guitarist
- Lyndon Ogbourne (born 1983), English actor
- Lyndon Lowell Olson Jr. (born 1947), American politician and diplomat
- Lyndon Pete Patterson (1934–2017), American politician
- Lyndon Rive (born 1977), South African-born American entrepreneur
- Lyndon Rush (born 1980), Canadian bobsledder and coach
- Lyndon Sims (1917–1999), Welsh rally driver
- Lyndon Slewidge (born 1954), Canadian police officer and singer
- Lyndon A. Smith (1854–1918), American educator, lawyer, and politician
- Lyndon Smith (born 1989), American actress and singer
- Lyndon Stromberg (born 1962), American sculptor and entrepreneur
- Lyndon Terracini (born 1950), Australian operatic baritone
- Lyndon Trott (born 1964), Guernsey politician
- Lyndon Wainwright (1919–2018), English metrologist and ballroom dancer
- Lyndon Watts (born 1976), Australian bassoonist
- Lyndon Woodside (1935–2005), American choral conductor
- Lyndon Yearick (born 1964), American politician

== Notable people with this surname ==
- Lyndon (surname)

=== Fictional characters ===
- Barry Lyndon, protagonist of the novel The Luck of Barry Lyndon and its film adaptation Barry Lyndon

== See also ==
- Lyndon (disambiguation)
