= Linden (given name) =

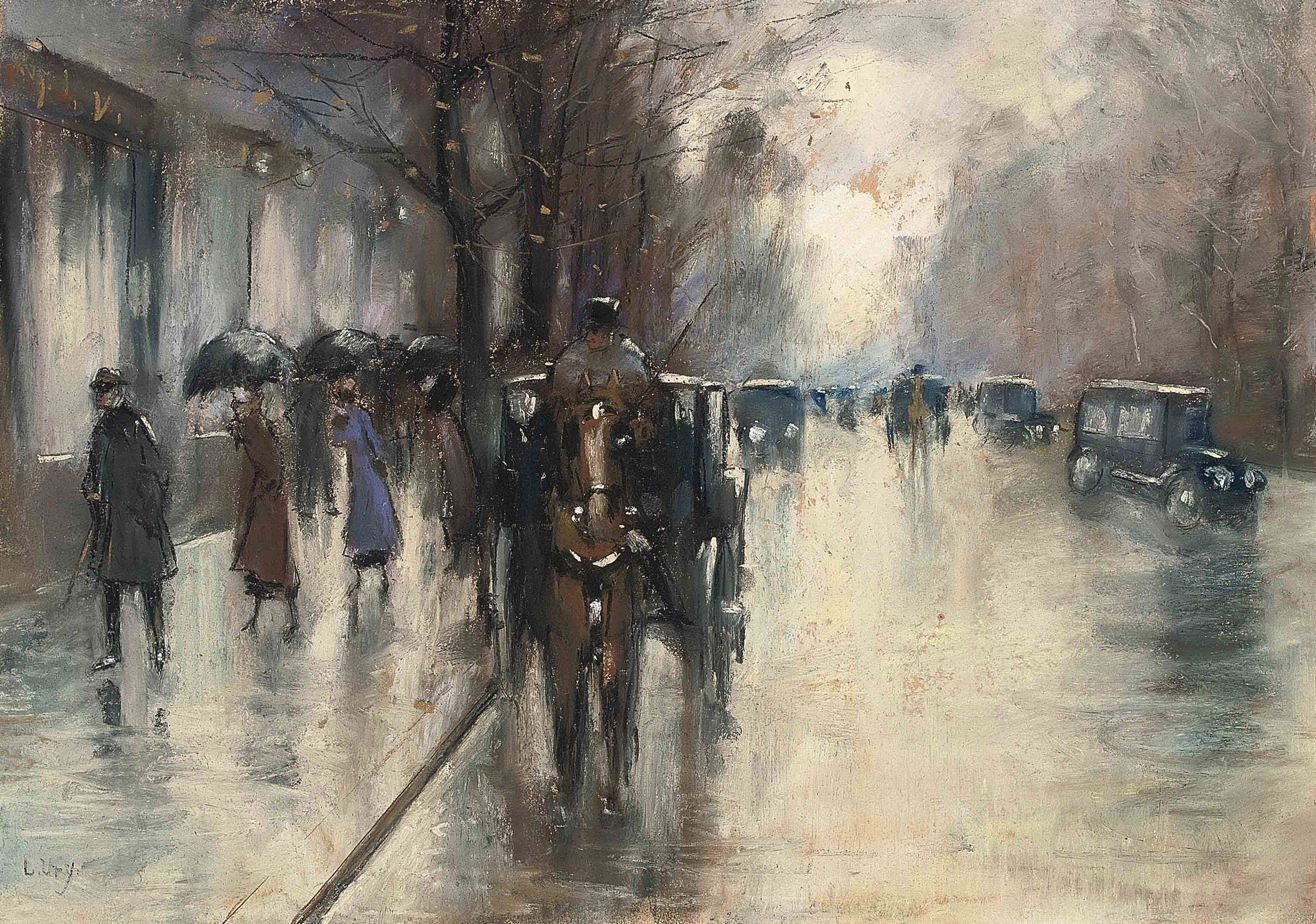
- Under the Linden Trees in the Rain by Lesser Ury, 1920.
- Gender: Unisex
- Language: English

Origin
- Meaning: Linden tree

Linden is an English given name referring to the Linden tree. In the United States, the name (along with variant Lyndon) was somewhat popular as a boys name from the 1930s to the 1960s. Linden reached a peak in popularity in 1947 as the 921st most popular boys name in the Social Security Administration's list of most popular boys names (and variant form Lyndon reached a peak in 1964 as the 347th most popular boys name), but currently it is not included in the list. The name has never been on the top 1000 names list for girls. In Canada, Linden was included in the Vital Statistics Agency's list of top 100 most popular boys names from 2003 to 2005.

== Notable people ==
- Linden Ashby (born 1960), television and movie actor best known for playing main character Johnny Cage in the hit movie Mortal Kombat
- Linden Blue (born 1936), American entrepreneur
- Linden Chiles (1933-2013), character actor that has appeared in hundreds of television shows and movies
- Linden Dalecki (born 1968), American writer
- Linden Jones (born 1961), Welsh footballer
- Linden Kemkaran, British politician
- Linden King (born 1955), American football player (linebacker) who played 12 years in the NFL
- Linden MacIntyre, (born 1943), Canadian journalist and author; reporter on PBS series Frontline
- Linden Porco (born 1996), Canadian television and movie actor
- Linden Rowat (born 1989), Canadian hockey player
- Linden Soles (born 1956), former CNN anchor
- Linden Stephens (born 1995), American football player
- Linden Travers (1913–2001), English actress

== See also ==
- Linden (surname)
- Linden (disambiguation)
- Lyndon (disambiguation)
