= Architectural sculpture in the United States =

see also Architectural sculpture

Circa 1895 limestone keystone

Contemporary clay model

Architectural sculpture is a general categorization used to describe items used for the decoration of buildings and structures. In the United States, the term encompasses both sculpture that is attached to a building and free-standing pieces that are a part of an architects design.

== Development in the United States ==
Widespread use of architectural sculpture in the United States began around 1870, and hit its high point between 1890 and 1920 while evolving through several styles. Philadelphia City Hall, constructed 1871 through 1901, is recognized as the turning point, because of the approximately 250 sculptures planned for the building, the large finial of William Penn, and the practical effect of Alexander Milne Calder training many assistants there. In that period most major public buildings were designed with sculptural programs of one kind or another.

Without completely disappearing, the practice declined with the advent of architectural modernism around 1940.

Integrated sculpture on buildings can range from full-figure statues to caryatids and atlantes; multi-figure allegorical pediments and the occasional quadriga; bas-relief panels, carved friezes, keystones, gargoyles, figures or designs on spandrels and tympana, cornices, brackets, columns and capitals, and decorative brickwork.

Architectural sculptures were made from a variety of materials which includes carved stone such as brownstone, terra cotta, cast iron, machine pressed sheet zinc, concrete and other materials. Terra cotta formed in plaster molds started to become the most popular material used in US cities in the 1870s. Some one hundred companies were producing terra cotta architectural ornaments by 1900.

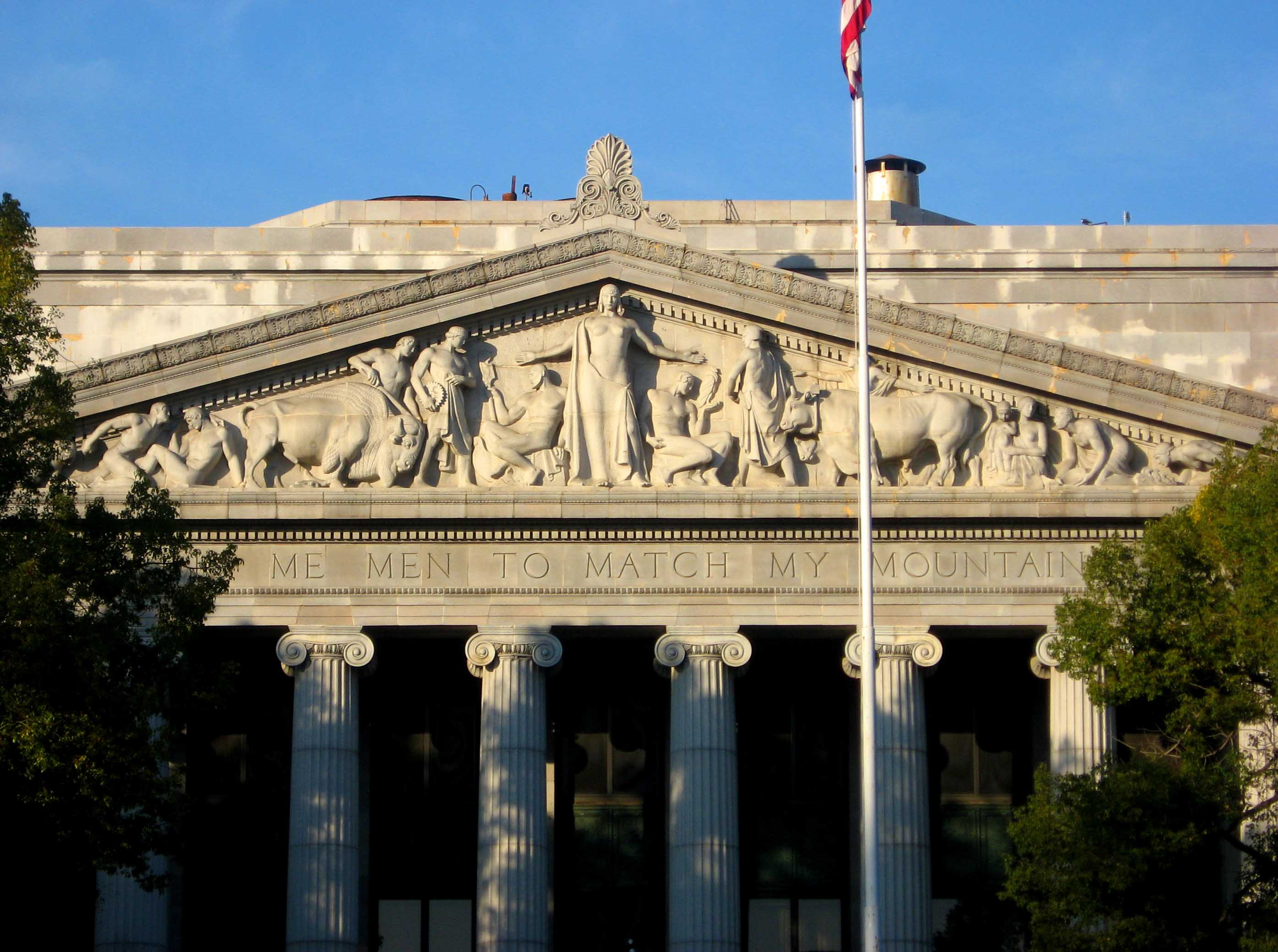
Pedimental sculpture in Sacramento, California, by 1928, following a style for ancient Greek temples

Many of the sculptures features Greek and Roman mythological figures and designs depicting a variety of gods, monsters and other fantasy creatures. There was also extensive use of leaves, flowers, vines, most of which had symbolic meanings associated with them.

The sculptures differ from common garden statues by virtue of their original intent as well as designs which were meant to be embedded into a masonry wall.

== The production of architectural sculpture in terra cotta ==
Before the 1870s in the United States, architectural decoration was fairly sparse and largely consisted of wood or hand carved stone; these were both time-consuming and expensive. Experiments with terra cotta for this use were done in the 1850s; noted architects Richard Upjohn and James Renwick made the earliest use of the new material. At first there were technical difficulties and failures due to underfiring, as well as fierce resistance from stone cutters fearing loss of their livelihood. By the 1870s terra cotta was fast becoming the material of choice, as it was far easier to make, allowed for unlimited designs and could be made rapidly and inexpensively. Large sculptures and decorative schemes were divided into a multitude of blocks so that they could be reassembled by masons with mortar and metal cramps in place on the steel frames of the new architecture. This protected the steel from fire as well as the elements.

The Chicago Terra Cotta Company, Midland Terra Cotta Company, New York Architectural Terra Cotta Company, Boston Terra Cotta Company, Atlantic Terra Cotta Company, Gladding, McBean and many others began production of models, molds and finished ware for architects nationwide. The process started with the architect's or designer's sketches and drawings; sculptors created original models in the factory, usually of clay and sized about 14% larger than the final product to allow for shrinkage. The architects approved the models or suggested changes to them. Once the model was approved, plaster piece molds were made of the clay models. At this point, in order to create many identical multiples, additional molds were made of the model or of the first plaster piece mold.

Properly formulated clay with grog (i.e., terra cotta clay body) was then hand pressed into these plaster molds. Average thickness was about 1 1/2". Internal webbing and holes were also added by hand. Pieces were removed sometime later from the mold, once the clay had stiffened due to water absorption into the plaster and then finished by hand to remove defects and add more details. The model number and other identity numbers according to the blueprints were inscribed in the clay to guide the masons' installation of the pieces. Once dry, the clay pieces were fired in very large wood-fired and later gas-fired kilns usually over a three-week period to a very high stoneware temperature. Various colored glazes and textures could also be applied to the visible surfaces if desired. Glaze increased the waterproofing quality, as did the (second) glaze firing.

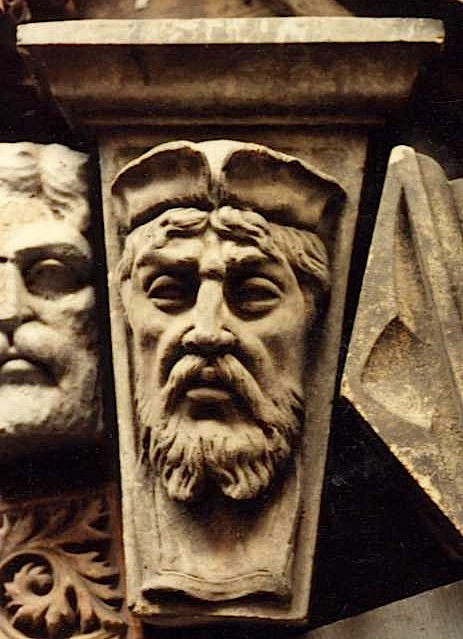
Circa 1895 terra cotta keystone.

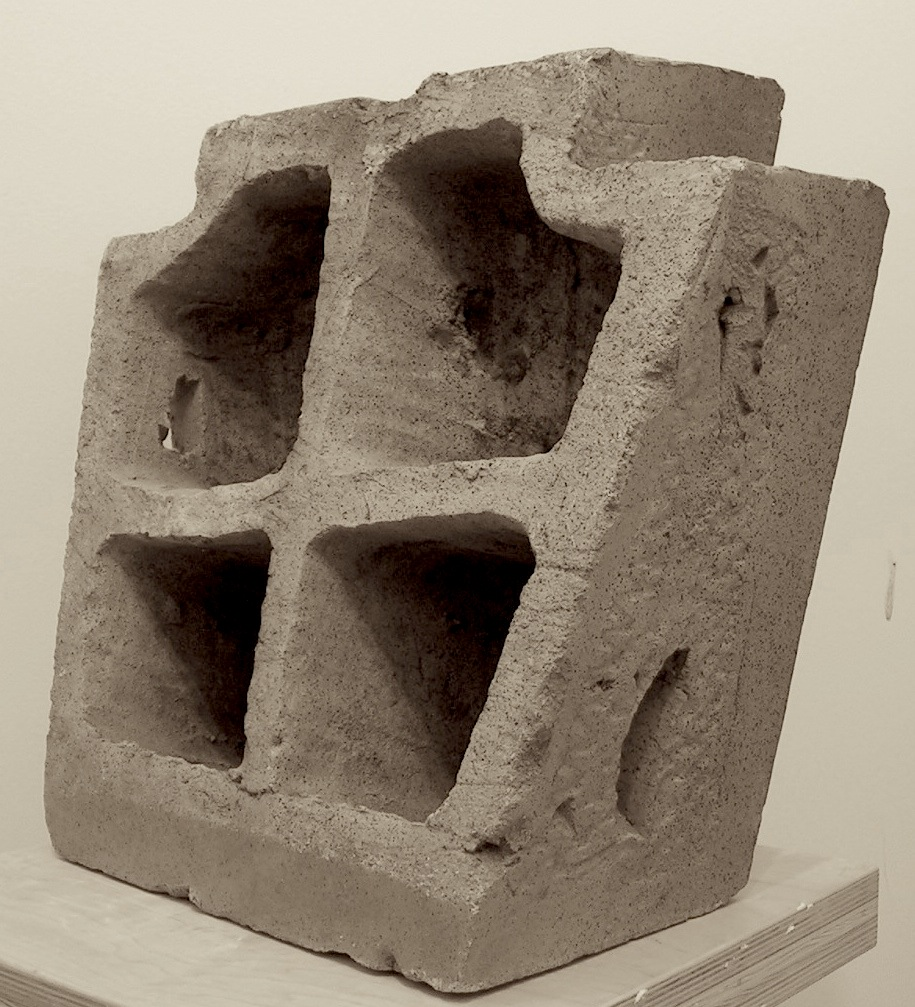
Back of a typical 1915 terra cotta keystone. Note the heavy internal structural webbing.

Back of a typical sculpture showing incised numbering system.

Multiple section terra cotta in the tympanum, a form used over windows and doors.

== Notable American architectural sculptors ==
- Clement Barnhorn
- Karl Bitter
- Caspar Buberl
- Rene Paul Chambellan
- Ulric Ellerhusen
- Marshall Fredericks
- Daniel Chester French
- C. Paul Jennewein
- Lee Lawrie
- Carl Milles
- Corrado Parducci
- J. Massey Rhind
- Ulysses Ricci
- Lyndon Stromberg
- Edward Wagner
- Adolph Alexander Weinman

== See also ==
- Pedimental sculptures in the United States
