= Linden Hall =

Linden Hall may refer to:

== Places ==
=== England ===
- Linden Hall, Northumberland, Longhorsley

=== United States ===
- Ricards House–Linden Hall, Bridgeville, Delaware, listed on the National Register of Historic Places (NRHP) in Sussex County
- Dr. Charles and Susan Skinner House and Outbuildings, AKA Linden Hall, Warren County, North Carolina, a plantation house on the National Register of Historic Places (NRHP)
- Linden Hall (school), Lititz, Pennsylvania, a girls' boarding school
- Linden Hall at Saint James Park, Lower Tyrone Township, Fayette County, Pennsylvania, an historic estate listed on the National Register of Historic Places, now used as a conference center and hotel.

== Persons ==
- Linden Hall (athlete) (born 1991), Australian middle-distance runner

== See also ==
- Linden House (disambiguation)
- The Lindens (disambiguation)
- Linden (disambiguation)
