= Lindon =

Lindon may refer to:

== Places ==
- Lindon, Colorado
- Lindon, Utah

Fictional

- Lindon (Middle-earth), a region of the extreme west of J.R.R. Tolkien's fictional Middle-earth

== Other uses ==
- Lindon (name)

== See also ==
- Linden (disambiguation)
- Lyndon (disambiguation)
- Lynden (disambiguation)
