= Linnaeus (disambiguation) =

Carl Linnaeus (1707−1778) was a Swedish biologist and botanist.

Linnaeus or Linne may refer to:

- 7412 Linnaeus, an asteroid
- Linné (crater), a crater on the Moon's surface

== Places ==
- Linnaeus Terrace, Victoria Land, Antarctica
- Linne, Limburg, the Netherlands
- Linne, Greater Poland Voivodeship, a village in west-central Poland
- Linne, Kuyavian-Pomeranian Voivodeship, a village in north-central Poland
- Linneus, Maine, USA
- Linneus, Missouri, USA

== People ==
- Carl Linnaeus the Younger (1741–1783), Carl's son who survived to adulthood
- Larry Linne (born 1962), American football player and businessman
- Samuel Linnaeus (1718–1797), Carl's brother
- William Linnæus Gardner (1770–1835), officer in the Indian army

== See also ==
- Commemoration of Carl Linnaeus
- "The Heir of Linne", a traditional folk song
- Linnéa, a given name
- Loch Linnhe (Linne in Gaelic), sea loch on the west coast of Scotland
- Linnet, a small bird
