= Linden House =

Linden House may refer to:

in England

- Linden House, Hammersmith, London, clubhouse of the London Corinthian Sailing Club

in the United States

(by state then city)

- Linden House (847 Linden Ave., Long Beach, California)
- Linden House (Marietta, Pennsylvania), listed on the NRHP in Lancaster County
- Linden House (Vermillion, South Dakota), NRHP-listed

== See also ==
- Linden Hall (disambiguation)
- The Lindens (disambiguation)
- Linden (disambiguation)
