= James Lydon =

James or Jimmy Lydon may refer to:

- Jimmy Lydon (1923–2022), American actor
- James Lydon (historian) (1928–2013), Irish medievalist and academic
- Jimmy Lydon, vocalist with the Bollock Brothers

== See also ==
- Lydon (surname)
