= Andy Linden =

Andy Linden may refer to:

- Andy Linden (racing driver) (1922–1987), American race car driver
- Andy Linden (actor), British actor

== See also ==
- Linden (disambiguation)
