= Eugene Linden =

Eugene Linden may refer to:

- Eugene Linden (author), American non-fiction author
- Eugene Linden (conductor) (1912–1983), American conductor
