= Blue Suede Shoes (disambiguation) =

"Blue Suede Shoes", is a classic rock and roll song by Carl Perkins

Blue Suede Shoes may also refer to:

- Blue Suede Shoes (film), a 1980 documentary on rock and roll, starring Bill Haley and His Comets
- Blue Suede Shoes: A Rockabilly Session, a live album by Carl Perkins and friends
