= Lindy Rodwell =

South African zoologist and conservationist

Lindy Rodwell (born 13 February 1962, in Johannesburg) is a South African zoologist and conservationist. She works on preserving viable wetland habitat and population sizes for the cranes of Africa south of the Sahara, the endangered blue crane and grey-crowned crane and the critically endangered wattled crane.

== Career ==
Lindy Rodwell was awarded a BSc(Zoology) and a Higher Diploma in Education from the University of Cape Town. Later she became Africa programme coordinator for the South African Crane Working Group of the Endangered Wildlife Trust.

Rodwell is currently a Trustee of both the Endangered Wildlife Trust and the World Wildlife Fund.

== Awards ==
- 1999 Whitley Gold Award Winner
- 2002 Whitley Continuation Award Winner
- 2002 Environment Award in Rolex Awards for Enterprise
