= Crazy Cavan 'n' the Rhythm Rockers =

Welsh rockabilly band

- Origin: Newport, South Wales
- Genres: Rock and roll; rockabilly
- Years active: 1970–2020
- Labels: Crazy Rhythm, Charly
- Members: Lyndon Needs; Terry Walley; Graham Price; Mike Coffey
- Past members: Cavan Grogan; Vance Vincent; Don Kinsella; Brian Thomas
- Website: crazycavan.com

Crazy Cavan 'n' the Rhythm Rockers (also known as Crazy Cavan and the Rhythm Rockers, Cavan & The Rhythm Rockers, Crazy Cavan & The Rhythm Rockers) were a Welsh rockabilly band associated with the Teddy Boy scene. The band formed in 1970, and were still actively touring and recording before frontman Cavan Grogan's death in 2020.

The band appeared in the 1980 film Blue Suede Shoes, which detailed the revival of 1950s rock and roll music scene at the time.

== History ==
The first incarnation of the band was formed in Newport, South Wales, in 1964 by Cavan Grogan (vocals), Lyndon Needs (lead guitar) and Terry Walley (rhythm guitar) under the name "Screamin' Count Dracula and the Vampires".

In 1968, joined by Brian Thomas (piano) and Don Kinsella (bass), they took the name "The Sundogs" which they borrowed from Alan Freed who was known as "Moondog" and combined it with their taste for Sun Records, a record label whose releases which they used to buy at that time. Then in 1970, with the addition of Mike Coffey (drums), they took the name "Crazy Cavan 'n' the Rhythm Rockers", a name which has endured.

In 1973, the band formed its own record label, Crazy Rhythm Records (named after their own description of their music) and released their debut single, "Teddy Boy Boogie" (backed with "Bop Little Baby"). In 1975, they released their first album Crazy Rhythm on the Dutch Rockhouse label. In 1976, they signed with Charly Records in the UK, and released their second album, Rockability. The band continued to play live, their final performance being at the Annual Rockers Reunion in Reading on 18 January 2020.

Cavan Grogan died on 15 February 2020, aged 70. He left three children and three grandchildren.

== Discography ==
=== LPs ===
Year	Album	Label	Notes
1975	Crazy Rhythm	Rockhouse	Re-released in 1981 by Charly
1976	Rockability	Charly	
1977	Our Own Way of Rockin'	Charly	
1978	Live at the Rainbow	Charly	
1979	Red Hot 'N' Rockabilly	Charly	
1979	Still Crazy	Crazy Rhythm	Re-released in 1981 as Mr. Cool by Charly
1981	Cool and Crazy Rock-a-billy	Big Beat/Polarvox	
1981	Teddy Jive	Charly	
1982	Hey Teenager!	Big Beat	
1983	Live at Pickett's Lock	Charly	Reissued on CD in 2003 by Teddy Boy Power
1984	Rollin' Through The Night	Big Beat/Virgin	Reissued on CD in 1999 by Crazy Rhythm
1989	Rough Tough 'N' Ready	Crazy Rhythm	Also on CD
1990	Crazy Times	Instant	Also on CD
1996	It's Wild, It's Weird, It's Crazy	Crazy Rhythm	Also on CD
2012	Rollin 'n' Rockin	Goofin	Also on CD by Crazy Rhythm

=== CDs ===
Year	CD	Label
2001	Rhythm Rockin' Blues (with Linda Gail Lewis)	Crazy Rhythm Records
2008	C'mon, Let's F***in' Rock	Crazy Rhythm Records
2015	The Real Deal	Crazy Rhythm

== Contemporary influences ==
- Zombie Ghost Train included a cover of "Teddy Boy Boogie", on their Dealing The Death Card album.
- Singer Sparky Phillips from Demented Are Go recorded with Hillbilly Moon Explosion a version of "Teddy Boy Flick Knife Rock'n'Roll", on the album The Sparky Sessions. He has previously stated that he was influenced by Crazy Cavan in his early days.
- Klingonz covered "Trouble Trouble" on their Still Stompin album.
