= Lynden =

Lynden may refer to:

- Lynden, Washington
- Lynden Township, Stearns County, Minnesota
- Lynden, Ontario
- Lynden Air Cargo, an Alaskan cargo airline
- Lynden family, Belgian nobility

== See also ==
- Lyndon (disambiguation)
- Linden (disambiguation)
- Lindon (disambiguation)
