= Lindon (name) =

Lindon, also spelled Lyndon, is both a surname and a given name of English origins, meaning "linden tree hill." Notable people with the name include:

== Surname ==
- Lindon (surname)

== Given name ==
- Lindon Crow, American football player
- Lindon Meikle, English professional footballer
- Lindon W. Barrett, director of African studies at the University of California, Irvine
- Lindon Wallace Bates, American civil engineer
- Lindon Selahi, Albanian footballer
- Lindon Victor, Grenadian athlete
- Lindon Berisha, Macedonian-Albanian pop singer
- Lindon Eaves, geneticist
- Lyndon B. Johnson, President of the United States
- Lyndon Hardy, physicist
- David Lindon Lammy, British politician
- Lindon Mushangwe, Zimbabwean professional chess player

== Fictional characters ==
- Lindon, knight and playable character from Fire Emblem: Engage
- Matthew Lindon, character from Marvel Comics
