= Linden Park =

Linden Park may refer to:

- Linden Park Cricket Club in Kent, England
- Linden Park, Massachusetts in Brookline
- Linden Park, South Australia, a suburb of Adelaide
- Linden Park, Queens, a park in the Corona neighborhood of Queens, New York
