= Seattle Symphony =

American orchestra

- Orchestra
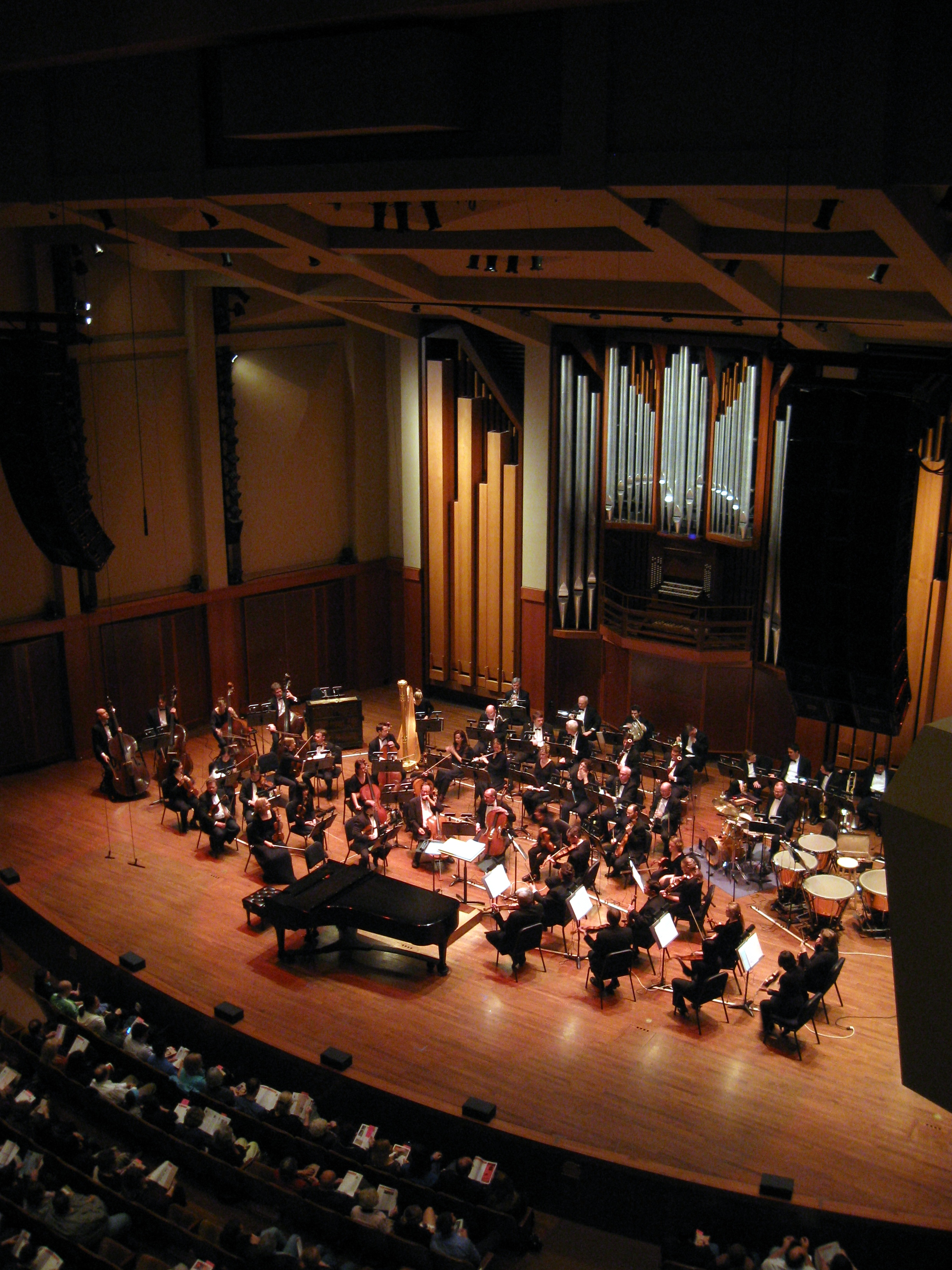
- Seattle Symphony on stage in Benaroya Hall in May 2009.
- Founded: 1903
- Location: Seattle, Washington, U.S.
- Concert hall: Benaroya Hall
- Principal conductor: Xian Zhang (2025–)
- Website: www.seattlesymphony.org

The Seattle Symphony is an American orchestra based in Seattle, Washington. Since 1998, the orchestra is resident at Benaroya Hall. The orchestra also serves as the accompanying orchestra for the Seattle Opera.

== History ==
=== Beginnings ===
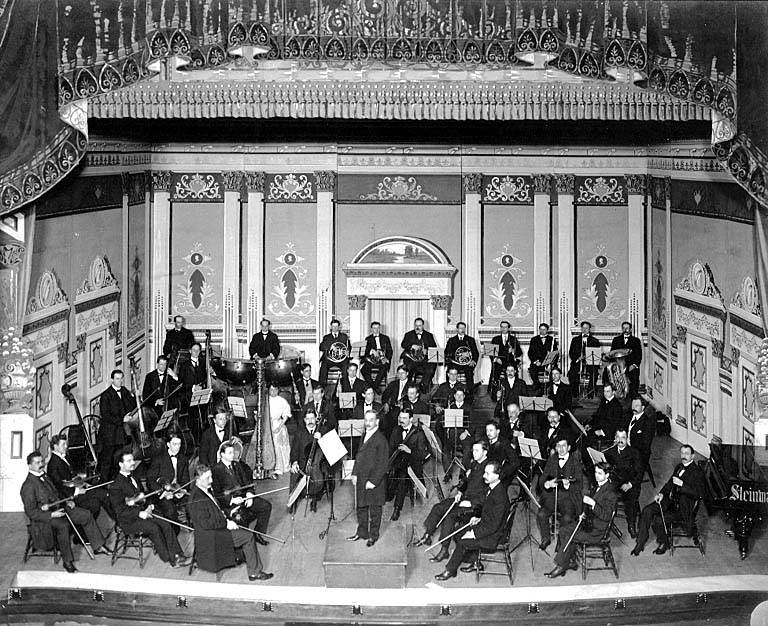
Seattle Symphony performing in 1908

The orchestra gave its first performance on December 29, 1903, with Harry West conducting. Known from its founding as the Seattle Symphony, it was renamed in 1911 as the Seattle Philharmonic Orchestra. John Marquardt was concertmaster of the orchestra in 1907–1908. In 1919, the orchestra was reorganized with new bylaws under the name Seattle Symphony Orchestra. The 1921–22 season was cancelled due to financial problems. The orchestra was revived in 1926 under the direction of Karl Krueger. From 1941 to 1943, Thomas Beecham was the symphony's musical director and conductor.

=== Pacific Northwest Symphony Orchestra ===
In 1947, the Seattle Symphony merged with the Tacoma Philharmonic to form the Pacific Northwest Symphony Orchestra. Performances were held in Seattle, Tacoma, and Olympia, with conducting duties split between Carl Bricken and Eugene Linden. This arrangement ceased after one season, when the Seattle Symphony decided to withdraw from it. A feud between the musicians and the board surfaced in 1948, and a majority of the musicians divorced themselves from the board and created a new orchestra called the Seattle Orchestra, a partnership (collective) operated by the musicians themselves, who chose Linden as their conductor. The Seattle Symphony announced a separate orchestra season with eighteen concerts at the old Meany Hall for the Performing Arts on the University of Washington campus. The symphony was to be directed by Stanley Chapple, and a series of guest conductors: Artur Rodzinski, Jacques Singer, and Erich Leinsdorf. Personnel for the Seattle Symphony were announced in the press on October 24, 1948, and included a few musicians who had chosen not to defect to the Seattle Orchestra and some new faces as well. The Seattle Symphony season was then postponed and eventually cancelled. The Seattle Orchestra, meanwhile, gave its first performance on November 23, 1948. An accommodation was reached between the Seattle Symphony and the Seattle Orchestra, and the two organizations merged, and the name "Seattle Symphony Orchestra" was retained. The partnership system was also retained, and musicians gained access onto the board. The partnership system was eventually dissolved at the request of Milton Katims in 1955. Even so, for most of its 100-year history, and especially today, the ensemble is known by the two-word name "Seattle Symphony".

Former Seattle Symphony logo under Gerard Schwarz.

=== Gerard Schwarz ===
Gerard Schwarz became music advisor of the orchestra in 1983 and principal conductor in 1984, before being named music director in 1985. Under Schwarz's leadership, the orchestra became particularly known for performing works of twentieth-century composers, especially neglected American composers. Together, Schwarz and the orchestra have made more than 100 commercial recordings, including the major orchestral works of Howard Hanson and David Diamond as well as works by Charles Tomlinson Griffes, Walter Piston, Paul Creston, William Schuman, Alan Hovhaness, Morton Gould, David Diamond, and others, for Delos International and Naxos Records. The orchestra received its first Grammy nomination in January 1990 for a 1989 recording of music of Howard Hanson. The orchestra also recorded a musical score to the SeaWorld, Orlando, stage show A'lure, The Call of the Ocean plus the score for the motion pictures Highlander II: The Quickening and Die Hard With a Vengeance.

Schwarz received praise for his championing of American composers and his skills in fund-raising. However, his tenure was also marked by controversies between him and several symphony musicians, which included several legal disputes. In September 2008, the orchestra announced the conclusion of Schwarz's music directorship after the 2010–2011 season, at which time Schwarz became the orchestra's conductor laureate.

=== Ludovic Morlot ===
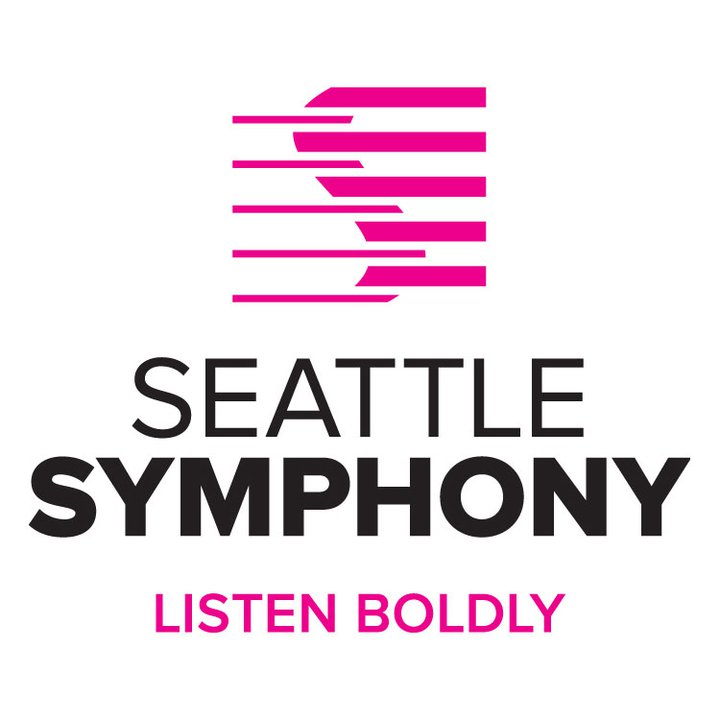
Seattle Symphony logo

Ludovic Morlot first guest-conducted the Seattle Symphony in October 2009. He returned in April 2010, as a substitute conductor in the wake of the 2010 Eyjafjallajökull eruptions. Based on these appearance, in June 2010, the orchestra announced the appointment of Morlot as its 15th music director, effective with the 2011–2012 season, with an initial contract of six years. During Morlot's tenure, the orchestra initiated its own recording label, 'Seattle Symphony Media'. In July 2015, the orchestra announced the extension of Morlot's contract through the 2018–2019 season. Morlot has taken particular interest in fostering music from Seattle-based composers, including composers within the orchestra itself. His work with the orchestra has included the commissioning and premiere of John Luther Adams' Become Ocean, which went on to win the 2014 Pulitzer Prize for Music and the 2015 Grammy Award for Best Classical Contemporary Composition. The commercial recording of Become Ocean, for Cantaloupe Music, led to a donation by Taylor Swift to the Seattle Symphony of US$50,000. Morlot and the orchestra have received additional Grammy Awards for their recordings of music of Henri Dutilleux. Morlot concluded his tenure as music director at the end of the 2018–2019 season.

=== Thomas Dausgaard ===
Thomas Dausgaard first guest-conducted the orchestra in 2013. In October 2013, the orchestra named Dausgaard its next principal guest conductor, effective with the 2014–2015 season, with an initial contract of 3 years. In March 2016, the orchestra announced the extension of Dausgaard's contract as principal guest conductor through the 2019–2020 season. In October 2017, the orchestra announced the appointment of Dausgaard as its next music director, effective with the 2019–2020 season, with an initial contract of 4 seasons. On 7 January 2022, Dausgaard resigned as music director by e-mail, with immediate effect. In an interview with Danish National Radio's P2, Dausgaard said, "I have felt threatened and I haven't felt safe with going to work."

=== Xian Zhang ===
In June 2008, Xian Zhang first guest-conducted the orchestra. She returned to the orchestra as a guest conductor several times, including in 2020 during the COVID-19 pandemic and in 2021 with the return of live audiences to concerts. In September 2024, the orchestra announced the appointment of Zhang as its next music director, effective with the 2025–2026 season, with an initial contract of five years. She took the title of music director-designate with immediate effect. Zhang is the first female conductor and the first conductor of color to be named music director of the Seattle Symphony. She will remain in her role as music director at the New Jersey Symphony through 2028, while also leading the Seattle Symphony.

== Music directors ==
- Harry West (1903–1906)
- Michael Kegrize (1907–1909)
- Henry Hadley (1909–1911)
- John Spargur (1911–1921)
- Karl Krueger (1926–1932)
- Basil Cameron (1932–1938)
- Nikolai Sokoloff (1938–1941)
- Thomas Beecham (1941–1944)
- Carl Bricken (1944–1948)
- Eugene Linden (1948–1950)
- Manuel Rosenthal (1950–1951)
- Milton Katims (1954–1976)
- Rainer Miedél (1976–1983)
- Gerard Schwarz (1985–2011)
- Ludovic Morlot (2011–2019)
- Thomas Dausgaard (2019–2022)
- Xian Zhang (2025–present)

== Performance venues ==
- 1903–1905: Christensen Hall, Arcade Building
- 1905–1906: Grand Opera House (Seattle, Washington)
- 1907–1911: Moore Theatre
- 1911–1919: Metropolitan Theatre
- 1919–1921: Meany Hall for the Performing Arts
- 1926–1938: Metropolitan Theatre
- 1938–1945: Music Hall
- 1945–1949: Moore Theatre
- 1949–1950: Meany Hall for the Performing Arts
- 1950–1953: Seattle Civic Auditorium
- 1953–1955: Orpheum Theatre
- 1955–1956: Moore Theatre
- 1956–1962: Orpheum Theatre
- 1962–1998: Seattle Opera House
- 1998–present: Benaroya Hall
