= Freddie "Fingers" Lee =

- Born: Frederick John Cheesman; 24 November 1937; Blackhill, Consett, Durham, England
- Died: 13 January 2014 (aged 76) Newcastle, England
- Genres: Rock and roll, rockabilly, country
- Occupations: Singer-songwriter, musician
- Instrument(s): Vocals, guitar, piano
- Years active: 1959–2002

Freddie "Fingers" Lee (born Frederick John Cheesman; 24 November 1937 – 13 January 2014) was a British singer, guitarist and pianist. His repertoire ranged from rock and roll, rockabilly and country music. He was known for his wild antics on stage, which sometimes included destroying a piano with an axe or chainsaw.

== Biography ==
Born in Consett, Durham in 1937, Lee lost his right eye following an accident with a dart thrown by his father. He would later sometimes cover this eye with a pirate patch. Working as a scaffolder in London in the mid-1950s he taught himself to play his landlady's piano.

His music career began in the late 1950s as the guitarist of a skiffle band. His music direction was influenced by Jerry Lee Lewis and he later said, "when I was a child I was impressed by Winifred Atwell who played piano and I did not think we could play this instrument as did Jerry Lee Lewis." He then joined Screaming Lord Sutch as pianist beside the young Ritchie Blackmore on guitar. He then toured with Eden Kane, Cliff Richard and Marty Wilde.

In 1960 he became the guitarist for the Screaming Lord Sutch and the Savages - it was Sutch who gave him his nickname - but moved to piano after Ritchie Blackmore joined the band. He often wore an eye patch over his right eye.

In the 1960s, Lee made many tours across Europe. Playing in the Star-Club in Hamburg, he met the Beatles and later said, "I am from the same background as them, the working class with the same ideal." He also played with many of his heroes including Jerry Lee Lewis, Chuck Berry, Little Richard, Gene Vincent and the Crickets.

Forming his own band in 1965, an early member was Ian Hunter, later to form Mott The Hoople. He released the singles "The Friendly Undertaker" (1965) and "Bossy Boss" (1966). His stage antics continued - with pianos destroyed with chainsaws and explosives.

In 1978 Lee joined Jack Good's revival of his successful 1950s show Oh Boy!. It was during this show that Lee took to wearing an eye patch. Lee was a notable performer on the show and made a star of Shakin' Stevens. Lee also released two albums, Freddie Fingers Lee (1978) and Ol' One-Eye's Back (1979). Lee appeared in the 1980 film Blue Suede Shoes which detailed the revival of 1950s rock 'n' roll music scene at the time. He destroys a piano at the end of his song with an axe.

Throughout the 1980s, 1990s and early 2000s Lee made many appearances at rock and roll clubs and festivals and played extensively across Europe. He suffered two strokes in 2002 and 2006 which ended his stage career.

== Death ==
Forced to retire from live stage appearance, Lee died on 13 January 2014 at the age of 76 from pneumonia in Newcastle, England.
