= Linden Square =

- U.S. National Register of Historic Places
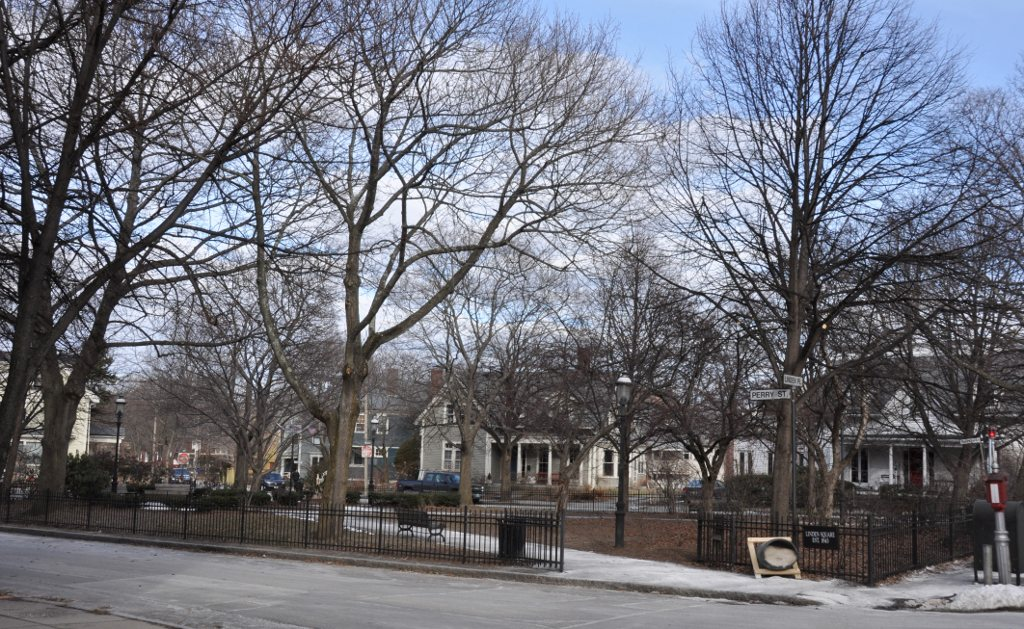

- Location within Massachusetts Location within the United States
- Location: Linden Pl., Brookline, Massachusetts
- Coordinates: 42°20′6″N 71°7′2″W
- Built: 1844
- Architect: Alexander Wadsworth
- MPS: Brookline MRA
- NRHP reference No.: 85003298
- Added to NRHP: October 17, 1985

Linden Square is a small municipal park at Linden Place in Brookline, Massachusetts, United States. Roughly rectangular in shape with one curved side, Linden Square was laid out in 1844 by Alexander Wadsworth as part of the subdivision of the area by Thomas Aspinwall Davis. Its original pathways consisted of a horseshoe-shaped path flanking its perimeter, and a straight path that bisected the park; it now has paths that form an X, a layout adopted by the late 19th century. The park consists of grassy areas dotted with trees, and surrounded by a wrought iron fence with openings for the paths.

The park was listed on the National Register of Historic Places in 1985.

== See also ==
- Linden Park (Massachusetts)
- National Register of Historic Places listings in Brookline, Massachusetts
