= Thomas Aspinwall Davis =

American mayor and silversmith

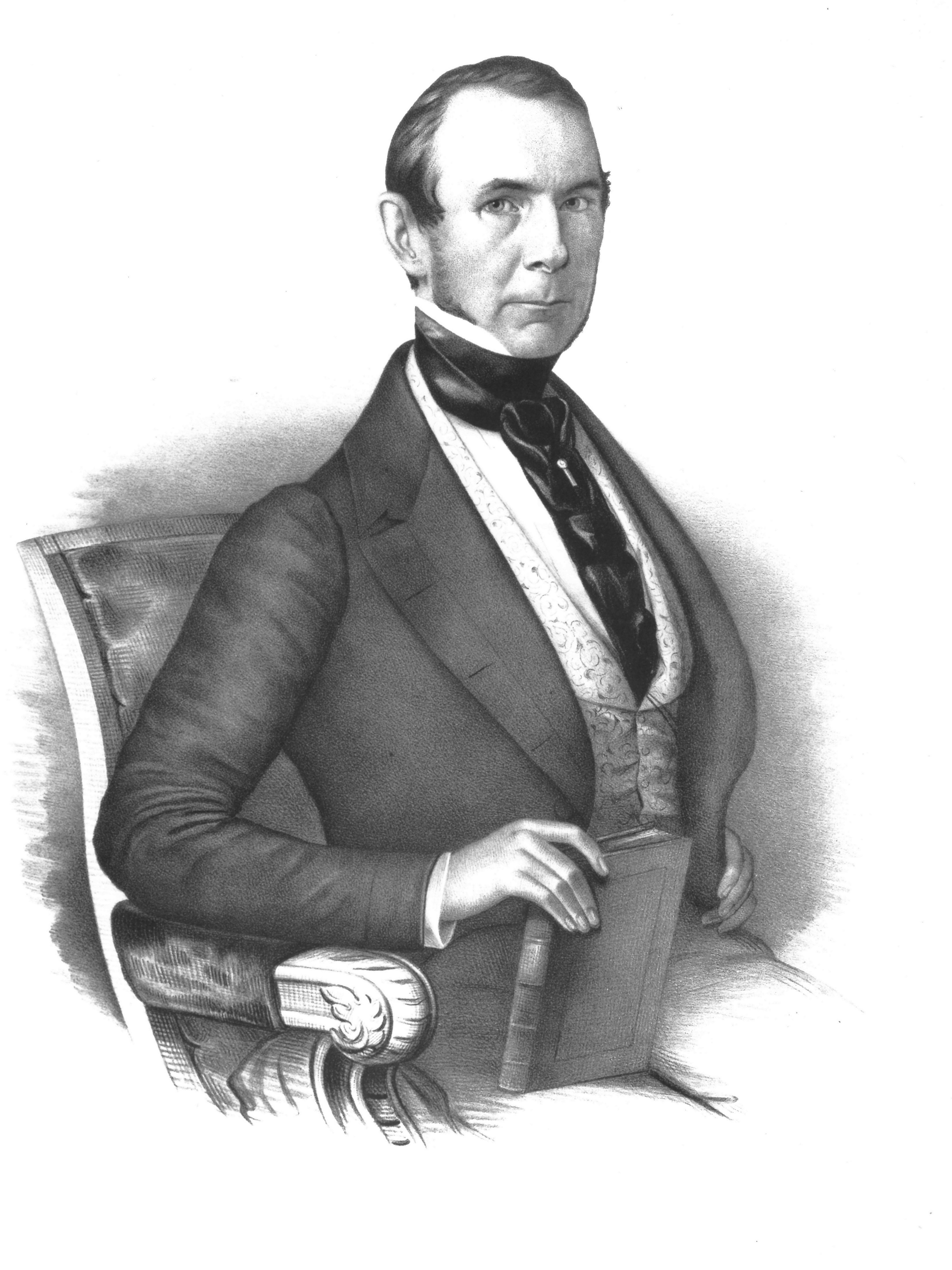

Mayor of Boston
- In office February 27, 1845 – November 22, 1845
- Preceded by: Martin Brimmer
- Succeeded by: Josiah Quincy Jr.

Personal details
- Born: Thomas Aspinwall Davis; December 11, 1798 Brookline, Massachusetts, U.S.
- Died: November 22, 1845 (aged 46)
- Party: Native American Party
- Occupation: Businessman, politician

Thomas Aspinwall Davis (December 11, 1798 – November 22, 1845) was a silversmith and businessman who served as mayor of Boston for nine months in 1845.

== Early life ==
Davis was born on December 11, 1798, in Brookline, Massachusetts, the son of Ebenezer Davis III and Lucy Aspinwall. Both the Davis and Aspinwall families were longtime residents of Brookline. Thomas' elder brother Increase Sumner Davis became a Congregational minister. Thomas grew up on Harrison Place (now Kent Street), and began work in a jeweler's shop in Boston at age 14.

== Business career ==
By 1820, he was in partnership with Thomas N. Morong. He had his own business 1825–34, and was a partner of Julius Palmer and Josiah Bachelder from 1838. The firm was successful, after his death known as Palmer, Bachelder & Co. By 1843 he had acquired, by inheritance and purchase, farmland around his father's house, which he subdivided to create The Lindens, a prestigious suburban residential development designed by Alexander Wadsworth and John F. Edwards. Davis' own house was at the head of Linden Park, until it was moved to 29 Linden Place in 1906. In 1985 it was added to the List of Registered Historic Places in Brookline.

== 1844–45 mayoral election ==
In the runup to the 1844 election Davis was nominated for mayor at a convention chaired by the showman Moses Kimball, who was best known for exhibiting a stuffed mermaid with P.T. Barnum. At this time a candidate for mayor needed a majority to be elected, and if no candidate received a majority of the vote a new election was held. A candidate did not have to have run in the previous round, and previous candidates did not necessarily run in subsequent elections. In the first vote held on December 9, 1844, in addition to Davis, the candidates were Josiah Quincy Jr., who led in the first round of balloting, and Adam W. Thaxter, Jr., who placed a weak third behind Davis. Quincy received 4,457 votes, Davis 4,017 and Thaxter 2,115, with a scattering of 232 votes going to others. Because none of the candidates had received a majority of the 10,821 votes cast no one was elected mayor. Quincy, the Whig candidate, and Thaxter, a Democrat, dropped out after the first round, with Thomas Wetmore and Charles G. Greene, the editor of the Boston Post, taking their places in the next round of balloting. Well, known Bostonians like former mayor Samuel A. Eliot entered the lists in ensuing rounds, but nothing could break the three-way deadlock. In each of the next six elections held between December 23, 1844, and February 12, 1845, there were at least three major candidates in contention for the mayoralty, and no one candidate received a majority of the vote. Davis led with a plurality on every round after the first.

In the eighth and final election held on February 21, 1845 there were only two candidates, Davis and William Parker, a Whig who had become acting mayor on January 6 when the previous mayor's term expired. In that election Davis received 4,865 votes, Parker received 4,366 and there was a scattering of 322 votes. Davis defeated Parker by 499 votes and receiving a majority of the 9,553 votes cast.

== Mayoralty and death in office ==
It was Davis' third attempt as a candidate representing the Native American Party, which had split from the Whigs the previous year. He was sworn in on February 27, 1845. His term of office was uneventful, the main issue of the day being badly needed improvements to Boston's inadequate water supply. He tendered his resignation on October 6 owing to ill health, and he died on November 22, 1845. His resignation was not accepted, and thus he died in office. John Pierce delivered an address at his funeral in Central Church on November 25.

In records published by the city of Boston list Davis' term is cited as ending on November 22, 1845. Benson Leavitt, a Whig, took over as acting mayor until new elections could be held.

== Personal life ==
He married Sarah Jackson, the niece of abolitionist Francis Jackson, on November 11, 1824, in Newton, Massachusetts.

== See also ==
- Timeline of Boston, 1840s

Political offices
Preceded by Martin Brimmer; William Parker (acting)	Mayor of Boston, Massachusetts; February 21, 1845 – November 22, 1845	Succeeded by Benson Leavitt (acting); Josiah Quincy Jr.
