= Linden, Idaho =

Unincorporated community in Idaho, United States

Coordinates: 46°39′54″N 116°30′09″W

Linden is an unincorporated community in Latah County, in the U.S. state of Idaho.

== History ==
Linden experienced a minor gold rush in the late 1870s. The Families residing on Cedar Creek Ridge applied for a post office in 1889 and the name Linden was selected. The post office was established in 1890, and remained in operation until the store / post office burned in 1928 [4] The community was named after Linden, Missouri.
