= Samuel Linnaeus =

Swedish priest (1718–1797)

Samuel Linnaeus (May 1, 1718 – June 20, 1797) was Carl Linnaeus' younger brother and the son of Nils Linnæus and Christina Brodersonia.

Linnaeus was born in Stenbrohult, Sweden. Linnaeus became a student at the University of Lund in 1738, but moved in 1742 to Uppsala, where his brother Carl had become a professor the year before. Samuel conducted research in Elias Palmskiöld's collection. The following year he moved back to Lund, where he defended his thesis De Wexionia ("On Växjö") on November 30, 1743 and December 10, 1744 in front of Sven Lagerbring. His thesis contained a detailed description of Växjö Cathedral before the fire in 1740. He received his Magister degree in 1745 and succeeded his father (died 1748) as a priest in Stenbrohult.

In 1750, he married Anna Helena Osander; the couple had twelve children. The only child who survived to adulthood died at 27 years of age.

Linnaeus was known as the "bee king". He published a book on beekeeping in 1768, Kort men tillförlitelig bijskjötsel. 90 years later, in 1858, it was published in a new edition under the name Bikungen (lit. 'the bee king').

Linnaeus died in 1797 in Stenbrohult.
