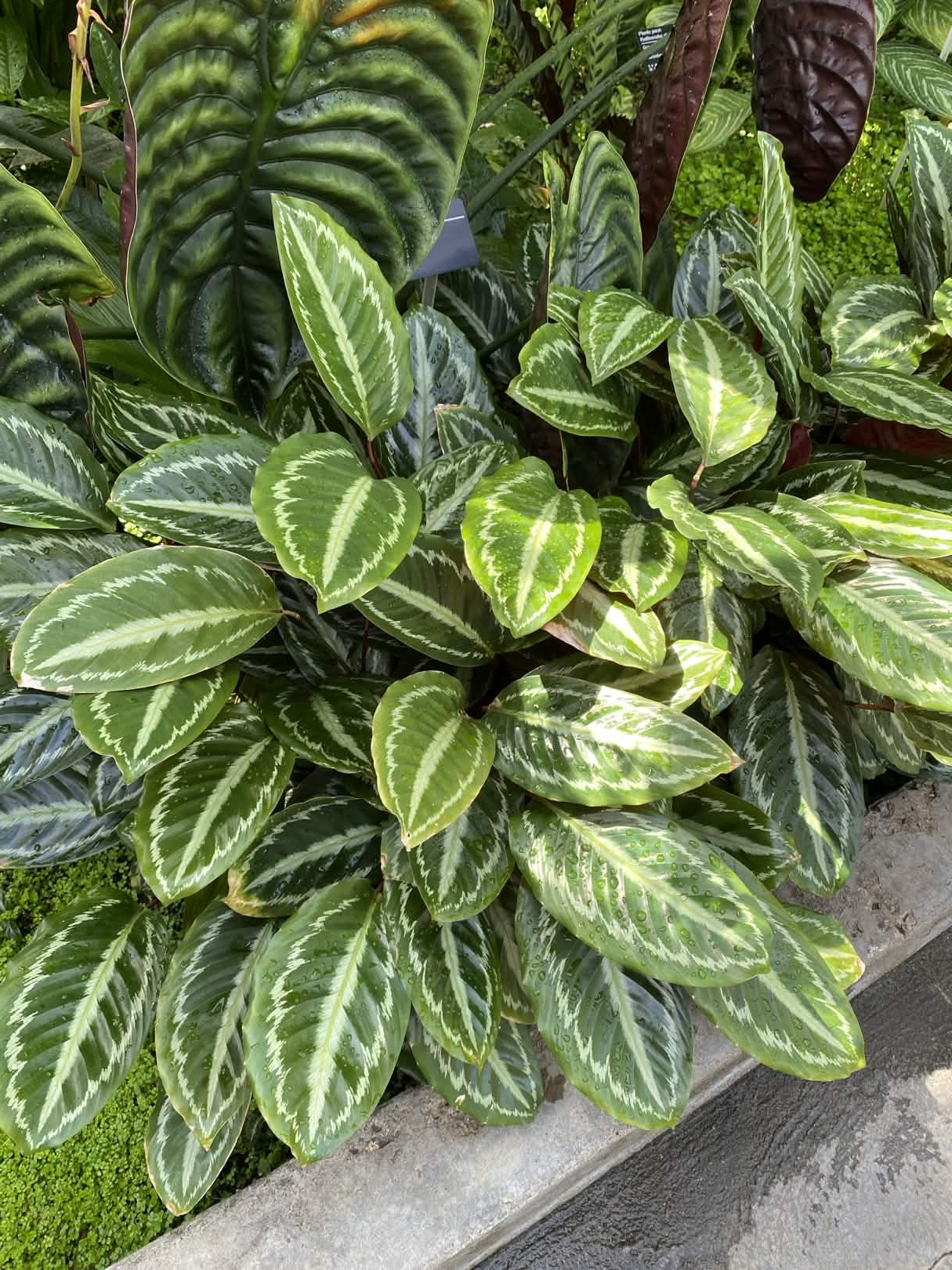

Scientific classification
- Kingdom: Plantae
- Clade: Tracheophytes
- Clade: Angiosperms
- Clade: Monocots
- Clade: Commelinids
- Order: Zingiberales
- Family: Marantaceae
- Genus: Goeppertia
- Species: G. picturata

Binomial name
- Goeppertia picturata (K.Koch & Linden) Borchs. & S.Suárez

Synonyms
- Calathea picturata K.Koch & Linden; Calathea gouletii Stapf; Calathea picturata var. vandenheckei (Lem.) É.Morren; Calathea van-den-heckei (Lem.) Regel; Maranta picturata (K.Koch & Linden) K.Koch & Linden; Maranta van-den-heckei Verschaff. ex Lem.; Phrynium van-den-heckei Lem.; Phyllodes picturata (K.Koch & Linden) Kuntze

= Goeppertia picturata =

Species of flowering plant

Goeppertia picturata is a species of plant now classified as belonging to the genus Goeppertia in the family Marantaceae. It is native to northwest Brazil. and has been introduced to Colombia, Peru, the Leeward Islands, and the Windward Islands.

== Description ==
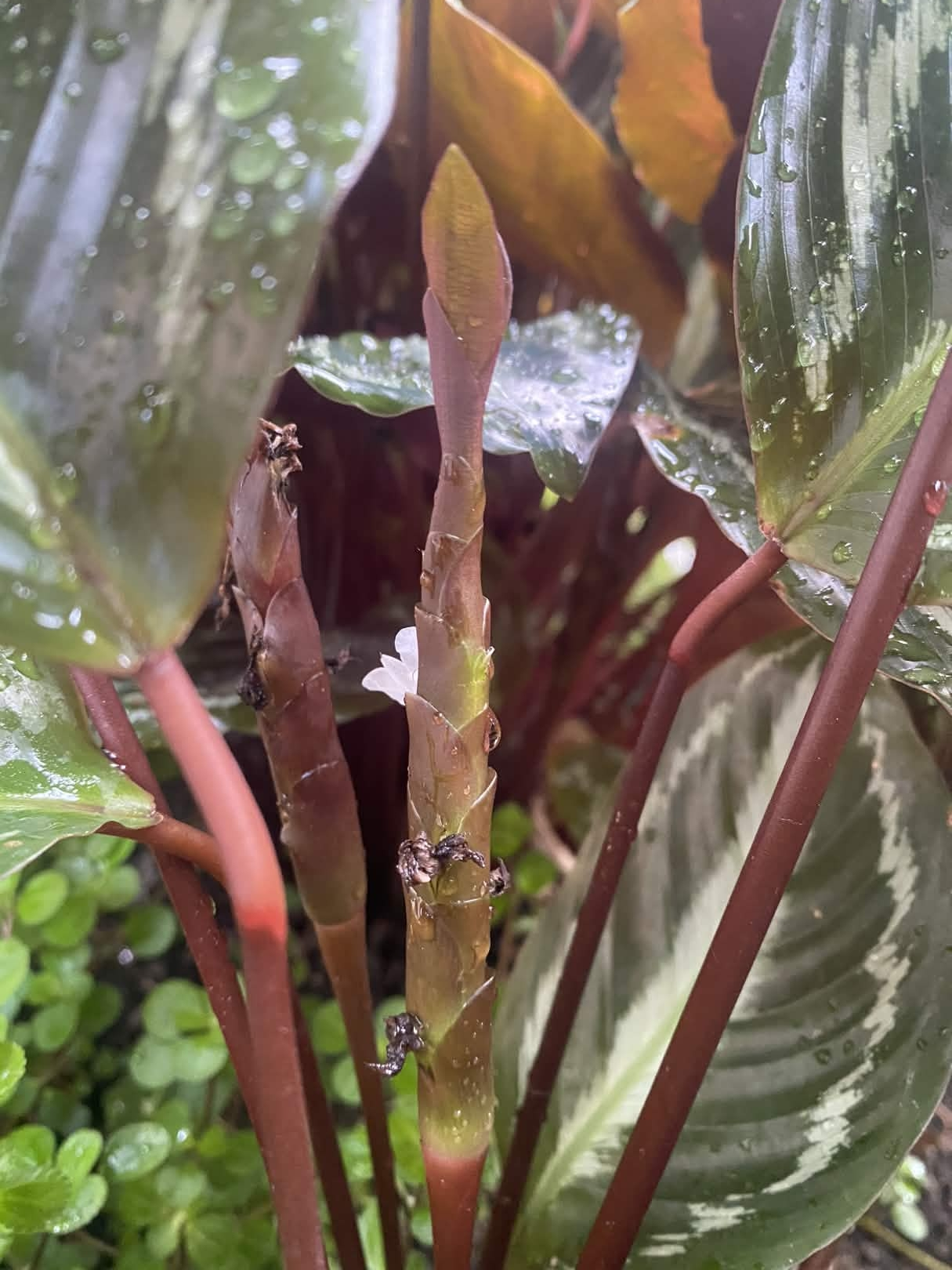
Inflorescence of Goeppertia picturata

Goeppertia picturata is a medium sized plant with ovale, pointy, glossy green leaves. It has long and thin petioles and a short pulvinus. It usually have a pattern on the upper side of the leaf which consists of one grey band along the middle vein and two thin, grey bands on the middle of each side of the leaf. The inflorescence of G.picturata is made of multiple bracts around a peduncle in a shape of a pencil. The bracts can be green or purple and are not hairy. The flowers will never change on this species and will always be fully white. The specific epithet picturata refers to having variegated leaves.

== Cultivation ==
The Goeppertia picturata cultivar 'Argentea', with silver leaves edged in green, has gained the Royal Horticultural Society's Award of Garden Merit.
