= Wolfgang Linden =

- Occupations: Clinical psychologist, author, and academic

Academic background
- Education: Vordiplom in Experimental Psychology; Diplom-Psychologe in Clinical Psychology; Ph.D. in Clinical Psychology
- Alma mater: University of Muenster; McGill University

Academic work
- Institutions: University of British Columbia (UBC)

Wolfgang Linden is a clinical psychologist, author, and academic. He is an emeritus professor at the University of British Columbia (UBC). His research interests have included psycho-cardiology, cardiac rehabilitation, determinants of hypertension, psycho-oncology, and the development of screening tools.

Linden is a fellow of the Canadian Psychological Association (CPA) and the American Psychological Association (APA).

== Education ==
In 1973, Linden completed a Vordiplom in Experimental Psychology, and in 1975, he earned his Diplom-Psychologe in Clinical Psychology from the University of Muenster. Later in 1981, he obtained a Ph.D. in Clinical Psychology from McGill University.

== Career ==
From 1973 to 1975, Linden was a research assistant at Muenster University. Subsequently, he held the role of staff psychologist at Bochum University till 1976. Later in 1978, he assumed the position of part-time lecturer at Dawson College, a role he held until 1981. In 1982, he was appointed as an assistant professor at the University of British Columbia (UBC). He was promoted to associate professor in 1989 and full professor in 1995. In 2018, he acquired the title of emeritus professor.

== Research ==
Linden's research has focused on cardiovascular health and hypertension, specifically psychosocial risk factors, stress reactivity, and behavioral treatments targeted at reducing health risk behaviors. He has investigated the association between stress and cardiovascular disease as well as the impact of psychological interventions on outcomes such as blood pressure control and mortality in cardiac patients. He has also evaluated the predictive role of socioeconomic status and social support on adherence to cardiac rehabilitation and proposed that adequate nutrition, educational support, exercise, and psychological support all contribute to optimal cardiac rehabilitation. He has also highlighted the cause-and-effect relationship between personality and heart problems. He has worked on social support interventions, stress recovery, and anger regulation.

Another theme of Linden's research work is psycho-oncology, including emotional distress, reduced quality of life, and the prevalence of anxiety among cancer patients. He conducted a meta-analysis and documented depression as a predictor of mortality and progression in cancer patients, as well as underscored the importance of integrating psychological tools to assess depressive symptoms in cancer patients. He has also contributed to the development of assessment tools, including a decisional balance tool for individuals with eating disorders, the Life Events Scale for Students (LESS) for university students, the Standardized Experience of Anger Measure (STEAM) for situation-specific anger, the Behavioral Anger Response Questionnaire (BARQ) for anger coping strategies, and a clinical screening tool named The Psychological Screen for Cancer.

== Books ==
Linden has also authored seven books, including Autogenic Training: A Clinical Guide, in which he described autogenic training as a self-hypnosis, calling it similar to meditation. Kent F. Bennington called it a "concise, practical, easy-to-read description of autogenic training" that "generously informs and carefully guides" practitioners. David Westbrook commended his writing style, stating he employed a "balanced approach" and wrote in a "clear" manner.

Linden's Stress Management: From Basic Science to Better Practice book examined the literature on intervention implications, highlighting shortcomings such as the focus on individual rather than social aspects of stress and the omission of positive psychology. The book suggested three distinct types of stress management programs: "systematic-preventative", "broad-based stress vaccination and prevention", and "reactive problem-solving interventions". Later, he co-authored a multi-editioned book titled Clinical Psychology: A Modern Health Profession, in which he presented clinical psychology as a contemporary health care profession that integrates mental and physical health through a holistic approach, offering a perspective on the practices across different countries. In 2024, he published The Illusion of Control: A Practical Guide to Avoid Futile Struggles and argued that individuals significantly overrate their ability to control others while neglecting the power they can wield over themselves.

== Awards and honors ==
- 2002 – Fellow, APA
- Senior Investigator Award, CPA
- Fellow, CPA

== Bibliography ==
=== Books ===
- Linden, Wolfgang (1984). Psychological Perspectives of Essential Hypertension: Etiology, Maintenance, and Treatment. Karger. ISBN 978-3-8055-3662-2.
- Linden, Wolfgang (1990). Autogenic Training: A Clinical Guide. Guilford Publications. ISBN 978-0-89862-454-0.
- Langosch, Wolfgang; Budde, Hans-Günter; Linden, Wolfgang (2003). Psychologische Intervention zur koronaren Herzkrankheit: Stress-Bewältigung, Entspannungsverfahren, Ornish-Gruppen. VAS-Verlag für Akademische Schriften. ISBN 978-3-88864-367-5.
- Linden, Wolfgang (2004). Stress Management: From Basic Science to Better Practice. SAGE. ISBN 978-1-4522-3866-1.
- Linden, Wolfgang (2013). Biological Barriers in Behavioral Medicine. Springer. ISBN 978-1-4684-5374-4.
- Linden, Wolfgang; Hewitt, Paul Louis; Saklofske, Don (2018). Clinical Psychology: A Modern Health Profession. Routledge. ISBN 978-1-138-68313-6.
- Linden, Wolfgang (2024). The Illusion of Control: A Practical Guide to Avoid Futile Struggles. Bloomsbury Publishing PLC. ISBN 978-1-5381-8365-6.

=== Selected articles ===
- Linden, W.; Stossel, C.; Maurice, J. (1996). "Psychosocial interventions for patients with coronary artery disease: a meta-analysis". Archives of Internal Medicine. 156 (7): 745–752. doi:10.1001/archinte.1996.00440070065008. PMID 8615707.
- Linden, Wolfgang; Lenz, Joseph W.; Con, Andrea H. (2001). "Individualized stress management for primary hypertension: A randomized trial". Archives of Internal Medicine. 161 (8): 1071–1080. doi:10.1001/archinte.161.8.1071. PMID 11322841.
- Hogan, Brenda E; Linden, Wolfgang; Najarian, Bahman (2002). "Social support interventions". Clinical Psychology Review. 22 (3): 381–440. doi:10.1016/s0272-7358(01)00102-7. PMID 17201192.
- Linden, W.; Phillips, M. J.; Leclerc, J. (2007). "Psychological treatment of cardiac patients: a meta-analysis". European Heart Journal. 28 (24): 2972–2984. doi:10.1093/eurheartj/ehm504. PMID 17984133.
- Satin, Jillian R.; Linden, Wolfgang; Phillips, Melanie J. (2009). "Depression as a predictor of disease progression and mortality in cancer patients: A Meta-Analysis". Cancer. 115 (22): 5349–5361. doi:10.1002/cncr.24561. PMID 19753617.
- Vodermaier, A.; Linden, W.; Siu, C. (2009). "Screening for emotional distress in cancer patients: A systematic review of assessment instruments". JNCI Journal of the National Cancer Institute. 101 (21): 1464–1488. doi:10.1093/jnci/djp336. PMC 3298956. PMID 19826136.
- Linden, Wolfgang; Vodermaier, Andrea; MacKenzie, Regina; Greig, Duncan (2012). "Anxiety and depression after cancer diagnosis: Prevalence rates by cancer type, gender, and age". Journal of Affective Disorders. 141 (2–3): 343–351. doi:10.1016/j.jad.2012.03.025. PMID 22727334.
- Linden, Wolfgang; Young, Sandra; Ignaszewski, Andrew; Campbell, Tavis (2022). "Psychosocial and medical predictors of 14-year mortality and morbidity in male and female coronary artery bypass graft recipients: a prospective observational study". Psychological Medicine. 52 (15): 3460–3471. doi:10.1017/S003329172100012X. PMID 33568235.
