= Lindy Kelly =

New Zealand writer

- Born: 1952 (age 73–74); Hamilton, New Zealand
- Occupation: Writer

Lindy Kelly (born 1952) is a children's author, short story writer, playwright and thriller writer who lives in Nelson, New Zealand. She has had 113 adult short stories and 13 children's books published. She has also written plays and poetry, and taught creative writing.

== Life ==
Kelly lives on a farm in Nelson and loves horses, (is the mother of six and grandmother of eleven), the New Zealand bush, gardening, swimming and of course writing.

== Writing ==
Kelly has been published in New Zealand, Australia and the United States and has won, or been commended in 29 awards. Her stories have been broadcast on National Radio and she is the author of 20 books for children and adults. Lindy has taught creative writing at the Nelson Women's Centre, Nelson Marlborough Institute of Technology and Nayland Adult Education classes. In March 2009, HarperCollins published her first adult thriller, Bold Blood. The book soon hit #1 on the New Zealand Adult Fiction charts, and spent several weeks amongst the top 3 NZ Adult Fiction bestsellers, battling with Lloyd Jones's acclaimed Mister Pip, and Kate De Goldi's The 10pm Question.

== Novels ==
- 2009: Bold Blood (HarperCollins)

== Reviews ==
"Like the sport it portrays, the novel is fast-paced and full of surprises; horse trials are hazardous enough without baddies making them even more treacherous. The individual characters are well-developed and believable. The heroine (and what a heroine!) is both cool-headed and volatile. Light relief is provided by limericks and a teen groom with attitude, plus quiet times with the horses (who also have well-developed personalities.” - Tedi Busch, Nelson Mail

"...a suspenseful tale that carries the reader along." Craig Sisterson, Good Reading
