= Lindén =

Lindén is a Swedish surname. As of 2013, more than 6,000 people in Sweden have this surname. Notable people with the surname include:

- Aki Lindén, Finnish politician
- Alex Lindén, Swedish footballer
- Arvo Lindén (1887–1941), Finnish wrestler
- Erik Lindén (wrestler) (1911–1992), Swedish athlete
- Erland Lindén (1880–1952), Swedish sailor
- Lars Lindén (born 1945)d, Swedish politician
- Pär Lindén (born 1966), Swedish sprint canoeist
- Sara Lindén (born 1983), Swedish association football striker
- Ulf G. Lindén (1937–2009), Swedish entrepreneur

== See also ==
- Linden (surname)
