= Lyndon Needs =

Lyndon Needs born 25/10/1950
- Genres: Rockabilly
- Occupation: Musician
- Instrument: Guitar
- Years active: 1970s–present
- Website: Lyndon Needs Myspace

Lyndon Needs is a guitarist from South Wales. He is best known as the lead guitarist of a Teddy Boy band Crazy Cavan and the Rhythm Rockers. Needs is a founding member of Crazy Cavan and the Rhythm Rockers and is known as a wildly extrovert showman guitarist. He has also made solo albums.

== Discography ==
=== With Crazy Cavan and the Rhythm Rockers ===
LPs

Year	Album	Label	Notes
1976	Rockability	Charly	
1977	Our Own Way of Rockin'	Charly	
1978	Crazy Rhythm	Charly	
1978	Live at the Rainbow	Charly	
1979	Red Hot 'N' Rockabilly	Charly	
1979	Still Crazy	Crazy Rhythm	Re-released in 1981 as Mr. Cool by Charly
1981	Cool and Crazy Rock-a-billy	Big Beat/Polarvox	
1981	Teddy Jive	Charly	
1982	Hey Teenager!	Big Beat	
1983	Live at Pickett's Lock	Charly	Reissued on CD in 2003 by Teddy Boy Power
1984	Rollin' Through The Night	Big Beat/Virgin	Reissued on CD in 1999 by Crazy Rhythm
1989	Rough Tough 'N' Ready	Crazy Rhythm	Also on CD
1990	Crazy Times	Instant	Also on CD
1996	It's Wild, It's Weird, It's Crazy	Crazy Rhythm	Also on CD
2012	Rollin 'n' Rockin	Goofin	Also on CD by Crazy Rhythm

CDs

Year	CD	Label
2001	Rhythm Rockin' Blues (with Linda Gail Lewis)	Crazy Rhythm Records
2008	C'mon, Let's F***in' Rock	Crazy Rhythm Records
2015	The Real Deal	Crazy Rhythm

=== Solo albums ===
Year	Album	Label
1982	Cool Schooldays	Magnum Force
1998	Guitar Grazy	Crazy Rhythm
