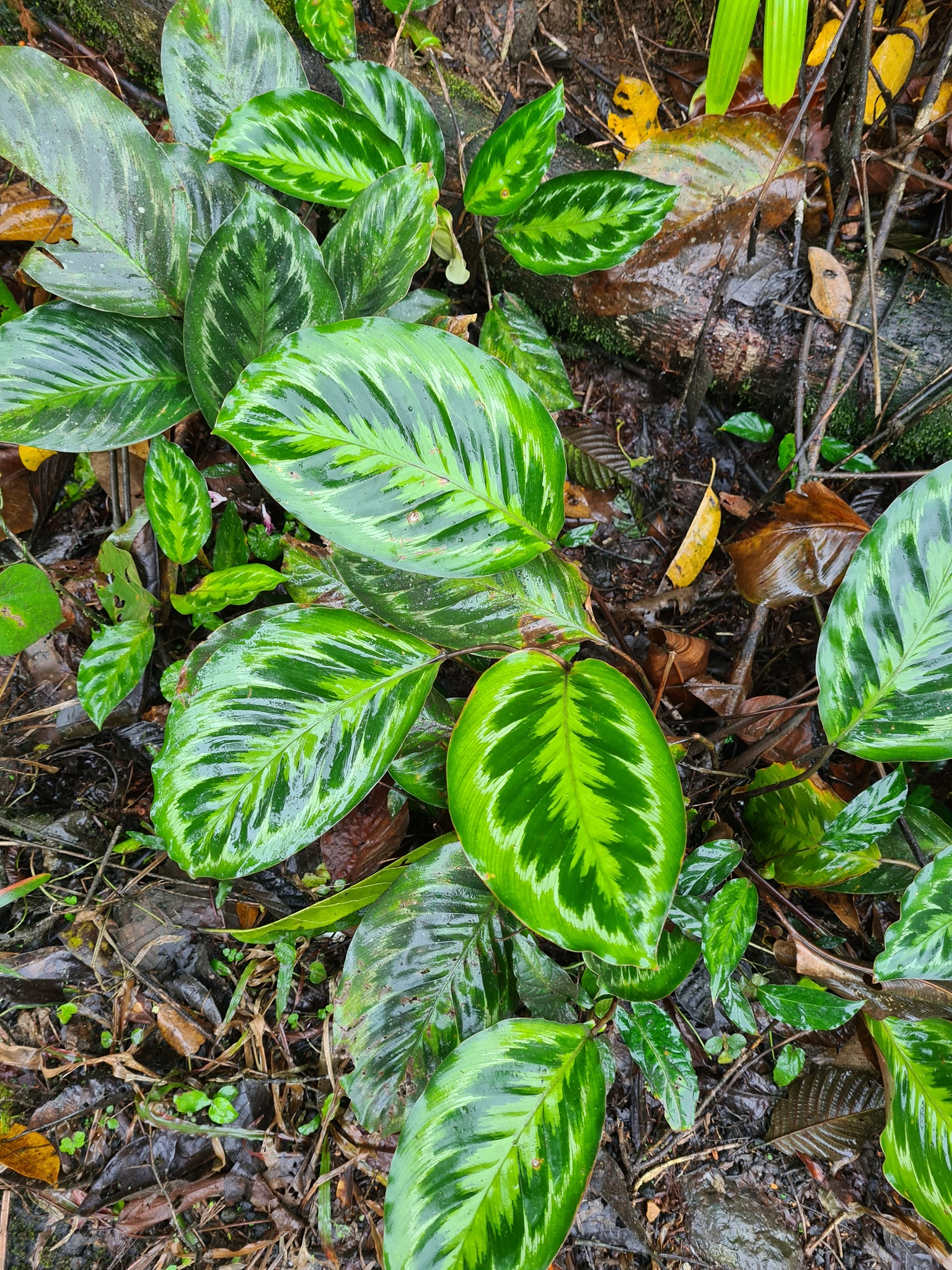

Scientific classification
- Kingdom: Plantae
- Clade: Embryophytes
- Clade: Tracheophytes
- Clade: Spermatophytes
- Clade: Angiosperms
- Clade: Monocots
- Clade: Commelinids
- Order: Zingiberales
- Family: Marantaceae
- Genus: Goeppertia
- Species: G. metallica

Binomial name
- Goeppertia metallica (Planch. & Linden) Borchs. & S.Suárez

Synonyms
- Calathea metallica Planch. & Linden; Maranta metallica (Planch. & Linden) Linden; Phrynium metallicum (Planch. & Linden) K.Koch; Phyllodes metallica (Planch. & Linden) Kuntze

= Goeppertia metallica =

Species of plant

Goeppertia metallica is a species of Goeppertia from the family Marantaceae. It is native to Ecuador, Colombia, Peru and Brazil.

== Description ==
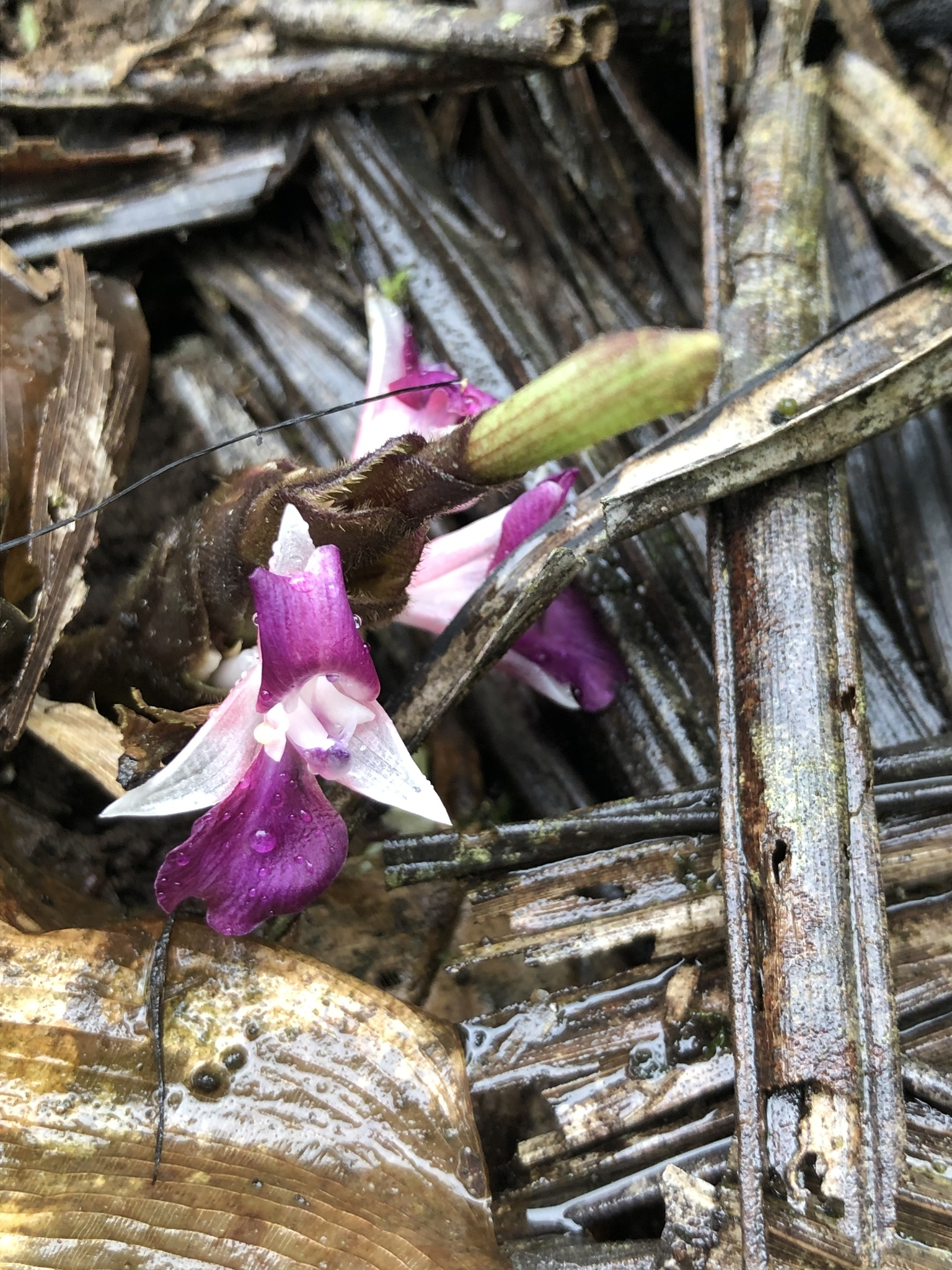
Inflorescence of Goeppertia metallica

Goeppertia metallica is a medium-sized plant. It has wide, ovale, pointy green leaves set on a long petiole and long pulvinus. This species is often cultivated for its beautiful pattern above the leaves. The whole plant is polymorphic, meaning the color, shape, pattern changes on every specimen. The pattern usually consists of a broad, light green band on the middle vein, two broad, dark green bands along the light green band and two, thin white silvery bands along the dark green bands. As it is polymorphic, this pattern changes a lot, and can be dark green, entirely green, without the white bands or with a white band on the middle vein. The inflorescence of G.metallica is made of multiple bracts forming a pencil shaped spike. The bracts are hairy and can vary from purple to green. The flowers are not polymorphic, they will always be the same color, which is the key to identify this species. The flowers are white and have two, intense purple staminodes.

== Uses ==
In Ecuador, Goeppertia metallica is traditionally used to treat the fungal skin infection known as manchas blancas. The roots are also used to treat other conditions such as coughs with blood, and excessive menstrual bleeding, by Cayapa and Colorado peoples, respectively.
