= Linden Park (Massachusetts) =

- U.S. National Register of Historic Places
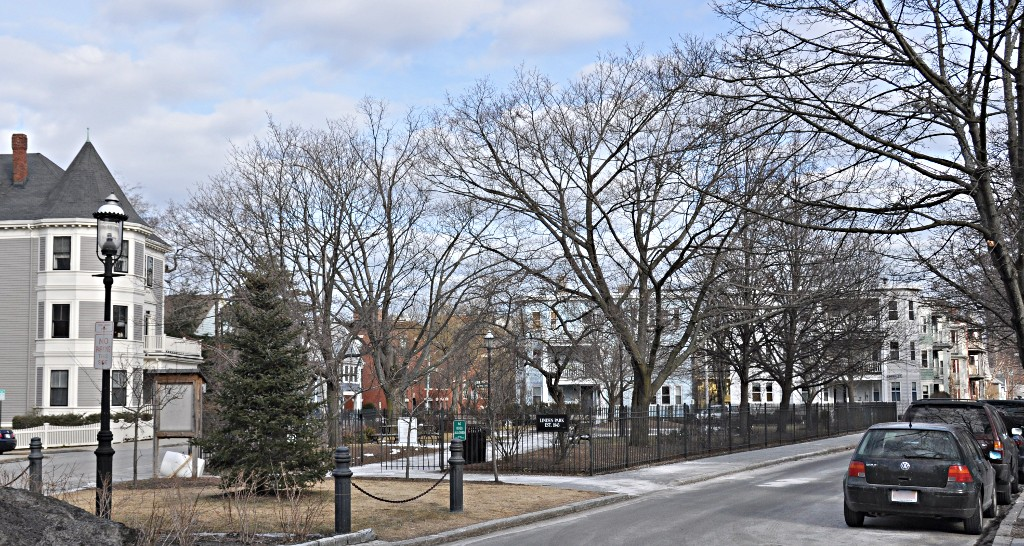

- Location within Massachusetts Location within the United States
- Location: Linden Place and Linden Street, Brookline, Massachusetts
- Coordinates: 42°20′5.78″N 71°7′4.91″W
- Area: 0.28 acres (0.11 ha)
- Built: 1843
- Architect: Alexander Wadsworth
- MPS: Brookline MRA
- NRHP reference No.: 85003297
- Added to NRHP: October 17, 1985

Linden Park is a small municipal park at Linden Place and Linden Street in Brookline, Massachusetts, USA. The triangular park was created in 1843 as one of several parks in the Lindens subdivision of the area by Thomas Aspinwall Davis, which was the first residential subdivision created in Brookline. In addition to generous setbacks, the deeds for the lots of this subdivision contained covenants excluding the sale to "Negroes or natives of Ireland".

Inside the park, October 2024

The park and neighborhood were designed by Alexander Wadsworth, and the park was originally held in common by the surrounding property owners. The park is now partially surrounded by wrought iron fencing, and has grassy areas and a playground.

The park was listed on the National Register of Historic Places in 1985.

== See also ==
- Linden Square
- National Register of Historic Places listings in Brookline, Massachusetts
