= Lindon W. Barrett =

Literary and cultural theorist

Lindon Barrett
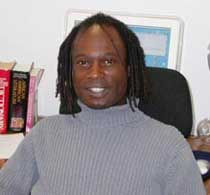
- Born: 10 October 1961; Guyana
- Died: 7 July 2008 (aged 46); Long Beach, U.S.
- Cause of death: Murder
- Education: University of Manitoba & University of Toronto (B.A), University of Denver (M.A.), University of Pennsylvania (Ph.D.)
- Occupations: Literary and cultural theorist, professor
- Known for: Critical race theory
- Notable work: Racial Blackness and the Discontinuity of Western Modernity & Blackness and Value: Seeing Double

Lindon W. Barrett (October 10, 1961 – July 7, 2008) was a literary and cultural theorist, professor and director of African studies at the University of California, Irvine.

== Biography ==
Barrett was born in Guyana to Dorothy and Leslie Barrett, later moving with them to England at the age of one. Five years later, the family moved to Winnipeg, Manitoba, Canada. Studying at both the University of Manitoba and York University in Toronto, Barrett received his undergraduate B.A. degree in 1983. Working toward his graduate degree at the University of Denver, he received his master's degree in 1986. Moving forward with his education, Barrett began work at the University of Pennsylvania in order to achieve his Ph.D., which he was awarded in 1990. That year, he started his first academic job, at the University of California-Irvine (UCI). By 2001, he had risen from his assistant position to full professor at Irvine. He remained at Irvine for 17 years until 2007, when he joined the faculty at the University of California-Riverside.

=== Academic career ===
Barrett was one of the founding members of the African American Studies program at UCI, where he served as director from 2003 until 2007. He taught an array of subjects at UCI, including literary culture and theory, gender and sexuality, African-American literature and pop culture. He went on to become a respected writer and author of numerous books that deal with race and other social issues.

=== Death ===
Barrett was found dead at his Long Beach home in 2008; he was 46 years old. He was alleged to have been murdered by Marlon Martinez, an apparent acquaintance, who died in jail while awaiting trial. Police were called to Barrett's home by neighbors who reported a "foul odor" in the area. Investigations found that his car was also missing and they were able to locate it on Paramount Boulevard at South Street and arrested Marlon Martinez as he attempted to enter the vehicle.

== Work ==
=== Racial Blackness and the Discontinuity of Western Modernity ===
Published as an incomplete manuscript the book approaches the "genealogy of how the development of racial blackness within the mercantile capitalist system of Euro-American colonial imperialism was constitutive of Western modernity." Barrett looks at the connections between historical systems of racial slavery to post-Enlightenment modernity, showing how Western modernity depended on a particular conception of racism.

=== Blackness and Value: Seeing Double ===
Barrett tackles multiple social justice issues speaking not only to theorists of race but also of gender and queer studies. He "investigates the principles by which 'value' operates, and asks if it is useful to imagine the concepts of racial blackness and whiteness in the U.S. operate in terms of these principles."

== Bibliography ==
- Barrett, Lindon (2018): Conditions of the Present. Selected Essays. Durham, NC: Duke University Press.
- Barrett, Lindon (2013): Racial Blackness and the Discontinuity of Western Modernity. University of Illinois Press.
- Barrett, Lindon (1999): Blackness and Value: Seeing Double. Cambridge University Press
