= Louise Linden =

American saxophonist (1862–1934)

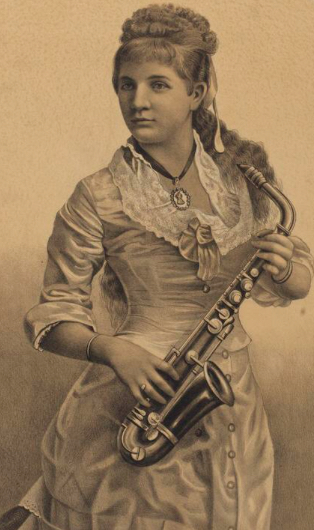
- Drawing of Linden on a theater poster, c. 1880

Background information
- Born: Louise Pott; September 10, 1862; New York City, New York
- Died: August 22, 1934 (aged 71)
- Instrument: Saxophone
- Years active: 1877–1881, 1896–1898
- Spouse: Benjamin C. Bent (m. 1878; died 1898)
- Parents: Henry Pott (father); Marie Pollfogt (mother)

Louise Linden (September 10, 1862 – August 22, 1934) was an American saxophone virtuoso of the nineteenth century. From 1877–1881, when female woodwind and brass players were rare, Linden performed throughout the eastern United States as a soloist in regional theatrical circuits, female minstrelsy, and vaudeville.

== Early life ==
Louise Linden was born Louise Pott on September 10, 1862, in New York City, to musician Henry Pott and his wife, Marie Pollfogt, who were German immigrants. Before she was fourteen, Linden moved from Brooklyn, New York, to Portland, Maine, to live with her sister Armena (b. 1852) and study saxophone with her brother-in-law Fred ter Linden (1839-1891). Fred ter Linden was the musical director of Portland's Orpheus Symphony Club, whose "membership was composed of amateurs in instrumental music".

Her first public performance occurred on October 6, 1876, at a musicale given by Fred ter Linden's pupils. On December 6, 1876, she played a saxophone solo at a lyceum program event at the Portland City Hall. According to a review that appeared in the Boston Traveller,

And now we have something new in the way of instrumental music. Miss Louise Linden has succeeded in mastering the saxophone, and has accomplished what no other lady has ever attempted. She executed a solo in the most artistic manner, producing the softest and sweetest tones, to the astonishment of all present. This was her first public appearance and was an entire success.

In the spring of 1877, Linden's friends from Brooklyn "presented her with a magnificent gold saxophone" in appreciation of her talent and skill.

== Professional career ==
=== Swedish Lady Quartet ===
Linden made her professional debut on September 7, 1877, in Reading, Pennsylvania, as part of a benefit concert for John D. Mishler, manager of the Swedish Lady Vocal Quartet. Fred ter Linden accompanied Linden on piano. Mishler then hired them to join the Swedish Lady Quartet on a five-week tour of central and western Pennsylvania and upstate New York.

During the remainder of the 1877-78 season, Linden played a series of concerts and benefit performances in the New York City area at venues such as Cooper Institute, Chickering Hall, Poole and Donnelly's Grand Opera House, and Steinway Hall.

=== Fenderson-Bent Company ===
In May 1878, Linden met Gilmore Band cornet soloist Benjamin C. Bent (1847–1898), and the two soon became romantically involved. Although not yet sixteen, Linden ran away with the 30-year-old cornetist on July 4. They married in Newport, Rhode Island, on July 18 after hearing that Linden's father had tracked them down and intended to bring her back home.

That fall, she joined the Fenderson-Bent Company for its tour of upstate New York and Ohio. Bent created the ensemble with soprano Juliet Fenderson to provide work while he was on sabbatical from the Gilmore Band during its European tour. In addition to their respective solos, the company's programs featured saxophone and cornet duets by Linden and Bent, which received praise from reviewers and audiences.

Although the company received enthusiastic reviews throughout the tour, its performances were poorly attended. By mid-November, the Fenderson-Bent Company disbanded due to "poor patronage" of its performances. Bent freelanced in New York City during the spring of 1879. In January 1879, Linden was engaged to play a series of concerts at the Bellevue House, one of four hilltop resorts that overlooked Cincinnati. She performed weekend matinees and evenings accompanied by the German Military Band. Linden finished February in Cincinnati at the Atlantic Garden, performing a series of "Grand Concerts" with Andy Brand's Full Orchestra.

Throughout the summer of 1879, Linden appeared as a soloist with Arthur Bent's Marine Band aboard the steamer Plymouth Rock during its daily excursion cruises to Rockaway Beach, located on the South Shore of Long Island (present-day Queens, New York).

=== Madame Rentz's Female Minstrels ===
Linden continued to perform independently from Bent, who had resumed his position in Gilmore's Band. In 1879–1880, she toured with Madame Rentz's Female Minstrels, beginning in upstate New York, then on to Pennsylvania, Ohio, West Virginia, Indiana, and back to New York. This venture marked a considerable departure from the settings in which Linden had formerly been presented.

Michael B. Leavitt (1843–1935), an American theater entrepreneur, manager, and producer, named the company after a European tent show called Rentz's Circus. In the early 1870s, "Leavitt conceived the idea of merging the lady minstrel show, vaudeville, and musicalized travesty into one production which he called burlesque." Leavitt's hybrid burlesque form retained the three-part structure of the minstrel show, though with an expanded and more varied olio (second part). Linden performed a virtuosic solo in the variety segment, encored by renditions of popular songs and ballads, and otherwise played in a seven-piece orchestra that accompanied the onstage performers. The afterpiece, a burlesque entitled "The Teutonic Tug Tub Pinafore," satirized Gilbert and Sullivan's operetta H.M.S. Pinafore, which enjoyed immense popularity in America that year.

Leavitt actually managed two burlesque companies with similar names. The Rentz-Santley Novelty Company, named after early burlesque star Mabel Santley, emphasized the female form over minstrelsy's racial or ethnic humor. Madame Rentz's Female Minstrels, however, retained the interlocutor and end men of the traditional minstrel show joined by an ensemble of "blondes," but without overt displays of sexuality. An engagement in Ithaca, New York, by Madame Rentz's Female Minstrels deteriorated into a riot after Cornell students disrupted the show because they became bored with its tameness.

=== M. B. Leavitt's Gigantic Vaudeville and Specialty Company ===
M. B. Leavitt claimed, "during the season of 1880 I used the term "Vaudeville" for the first time in connection with a variety entertainment in America." Leavitt's new Gigantic Vaudeville and Specialty Company featured a diverse combination of variety acts—such as gymnasts, acrobats, rope skippers, comedians, operatic singers, sketch actors, and musicians—"strung together to produce a compete bill of entertainment".

Linden's publicity poster from Leavitt's Gigantic Vaudeville and Specialty Company presented her "in a manner befitting a respectable artist," in contrast to the female burlesque performers of The Rentz-Santley Novelty Company. "She wears a fashionable corseted dress with a bustle and long train, a cameo necklace, and a ribbon in her elaborately coiffed hair. She holds her alto saxophone at an angle that complements her dignified pose. The image of refinement projected visually by Linden's poster corresponds to the sophistication that her musical performances would provide to the company's bill in balancing the more entertainment-oriented acts."

After an opening week in Brooklyn, New York, at the end of August 1880, Leavitt's "Gigantics" embarked on an eight-month tour of major cities throughout the East and Midwest, including Philadelphia, Boston, Washington, Pittsburgh, Cincinnati, Detroit, Chicago, numerous small towns in Wisconsin and Iowa, Kansas City, St. Louis, more small cities and towns in Indiana and Ohio, Cleveland, then finishing the year in the Northeast. In 1881, the company made repeat visits to many of its fall destinations; after a week in Chicago at the end of February, the route turned eastward, with a season-ending week in New York City at the end of April. These bookings typically featured week-long engagements in the larger cities' prominent theaters. In between its visits to larger cities, the company would be booked in a series of one-night stands in smaller towns within a single region (such as Iowa or Pennsylvania), or in medium-sized cities in the direction of the next big-city destination.

Within such a large company, Linden did not stand out as much as she had with the Swedish Lady Quartet or Fenderson-Bent concert parties. The acrobatic Garretta family typically received the greatest attention, but Linden earned numerous positive mentions in the troupe's reviews. During the season's opening week in Brooklyn, "Miss Louise Linden, the only lady saxophone artiste in the world, astonished and delighted her audience by the unexpected excellence of her playing." After her success in Chicago, she was called "a charming saxophone soloist" in St. Louis. A reviewer in Indianapolis wrote, "Miss Louise Linden is certainly great on the saxophone; it is a very difficult instrument to play upon, but she seems to have mastered it." In cities where Linden had performed prior to her time in vaudeville, reviews and audience response were especially positive. In Cincinnati, she was described as "a little German band in herself," giving "selections artistically performed on the saxophone". A review in Buffalo, New York, proclaimed, "Miss Louise Linden is known as an accomplished saxophone soloist. Her solo was deservedly encored." She was recalled for encores in Rochester, as well. In the closing week of the season, at New York City's San Francisco Opera House, "Mlle. Louise Linden displayed her dexterity in playing the saxophone. . . . The house was full and the audience manifested its enjoyment frequently and decidedly."

=== After Leavitt ===
After the 1880–81 season, Linden took a fifteen-year hiatus from performing to raise children. (Benjamin Bent Jr. was born in 1883. According to the 1900 US Census, she had had two other children who died before adulthood.) By the mid-1890s, Louise Linden Bent became musically active again. On 8–9 February 1896, she was a featured soloist with Innes' Band at the Montauk Theater in Brooklyn, receiving encores for her performance of Paganini Air Varie. That November, Linden Bent returned to vaudeville, appearing for a week on the bill at Proctor's Pleasure Palace in New York City. Her selections received numerous encores. During the 1896–97 season, she had a successful run at Hammerstein's Olympia. On 7 February 1897, she participated in a benefit concert for the Treasurer's Club of America at the Broadway Theater in New York. Her final documented performance occurred on 27 March 1898, when she and Benjamin Bent appeared at a benefit performance for philanthropist Henriette Markstein at the American Theater in New York.

After Benjamin Bent's death on 30 December 1898, Louise Linden Bent moved from Harlem to the Bronx. She was no longer musically active and likely lived for a time on the income from her husband's investments and estate. By 1920, Linden Bent worked as a matron for the telephone company, overseeing young female operators. She was subsequently employed as a matron by Edison Company. Louise Linden Bent died on 22 August 1934 after an eight-month bout of breast cancer.

== Repertoire ==
Linden's performing repertoire featured both virtuosic and expressive compositions. (As few original concertos for saxophone existed at that time, performers such as Edward A. Lefebre (1834-1911) often soloed using the theme and variations format.) On 13 January 1878, Linden performed "Variations di Concert" by Paganini at the Grand Opera House in New York City. (In 1876, before she turned professional, Linden likely performed the same solo under slightly different titles: Variation de Concerto and Variationi di Concerto.) This composition, whether an arrangement of a piece by Paganini or a set of variations on one of his musical themes, likely showcased Linden's technical virtuosity on the saxophone. She also played variations on the Carnival of Venice. Popular melodies, such as Stephen C. Foster's "Old Folks at Home," Henry Bishop and John Howard Payne's "Home, Sweet Home", S. Filmore Bennet and Joseph P. Webster's "In the Sweet By-and-By", and "Coming Through the Rye", were given as encores.

== Critical reception ==
Critical reviews of Linden's performances "acknowledged the virtuosity that Linden typically exhibited onstage . . . consistently [reporting] enthusiastic audience reaction and routine calls for encores." When she was sixteen, Buffalo Courier favorably compared Linden to Lefebre—the pre-eminent saxophone soloist of the time—finding her playing to have "all the masculine strength of the soloist who is such a favorite in Gilmore's Band, but her tonguing is better, and in delicacy and in correctness of expression she is his superior."

Another review in the Courier praised her technique and breath control.

Miss Louise Linden, the remarkable performer upon the saxophone . . . is said to be superior as any performer in the country. Her powers of execution are marvellous and she can play a long and difficult passage, that ordinarily requires from two to three inspirations, without removing the instrument from her lips or taking breath.

Due to the rarity of female wind players and the novelty of the saxophone, both Linden and her instrument were promoted—and received—as novelties. Reviewers often attempted to describe the sound of the saxophone to readers who presumably had never heard the instrument.

The most pleasing part of the programme at this resort during the past week was the Saxophone solos by Miss Louise Linden. This instrument is but little known, but in the hands of such an artist is capable of some most charming effects. Its tones are a mixture of clarionette, saxhorn and bassoon, susceptible of great modulations and flexibility of sound, and resembling somewhat the human voice.

Cornetist Anna Theresa Berger (1853–1925) was Linden's closest peer as a musician, and each equaled prominent male soloists on her respective instrument in both technique and expression. Although Linden and Berger both received exceedingly positive reviews, these were often tempered by disclaimers taking into account their gender. Linden's 1881 performance of The Carnival of Venice at the Summer-Garden Concerts at the Academy of Music in Baltimore, created

much interest by her superior execution on the instrument. She played in response "Old Folks at Home" very sweetly. Later in the evening she played "Home, Sweet Home." The audience were entertained not only with the music but with the novelty. It is an exceptional thing for men to play solos on the saxophone, let alone a woman."

A reviewer from the Rochester, New York, Union & Advertiser expressed astonishment that a woman could display such capability on a wind instrument.

By far the most remarkable performance of the evening, however, was Miss Louise Linden's playing upon the saxophone. This instrument, a comparatively modern invention, requires not only great endurance in a player, but also the utmost facility of manipulation. These difficulties were most brilliantly surmounted by the young lady. It must have required no slight amount of courage for a woman to undertake so unusual a task as the learning of a wind instrument, and no slight amount of perseverance to overcome the many obstacles that such a task would naturally present. The artistic finish with which Miss Linden acquitted herself last night merits unstinted praise and admiration.
