= Blue Suede Shoes (film) =

- Directed by: Curtis Clark
- Starring: Crazy Cavan 'n' the Rhythm Rockers; Bill Haley and the Comets; Ray Campi and his Rockabilly Rebels; Matchbox
- Distributed by: Kendon Films Ltd.
- Release date: 20 April 1980
- Running time: 97 mins
- Country: United Kingdom
- Language: English

Blue Suede Shoes is a 1980 music documentary film directed by Curtis Clark and produced by Don Boyd with Penny Clark that combines archival film of early American rock 'n' roll pioneers of the 1950s (with footage of Bill Haley's 1957 British tour, an Eddie Cochran television appearance and late 1960s concert footage of Gene Vincent) and British singers Cliff Richard and Tommy Steele with material recorded at a 1979 rock 'n' roll revival weekender featuring bands and people following the scene (including Teddy Boys, motorcycle greasers and rockabilly adherents).

The film was part of a £3 million slate of five films produced by Don Boyd.

== Synopsis ==
The documentary includes archive material from the 1950s plus later concert footage from Gene Vincent (1970). The film includes footage from a revival weekend at a holiday camp in Great Yarmouth, England. The weekend footage includes footage of shows by various bands of the period and after. The film concludes with a 15-minute excerpt from a March 1979 performance by Bill Haley and His Comets recorded during his "comeback tour" in London. Although Haley continued to tour and perform until May 1980, this was his final film appearance.

== Featured musicians ==
- Bill Haley
- Ray Campi and his Rockabilly Rebels
- Freddie 'Fingers' Lee
- Kevin Carey
- Eddie Cochran
- Cliff Richard
- Tommy Steele
- Gene Vincent

== Reception ==
Professional ratings
Review scores
Source	Rating
Radio Times Guide to Films	2/5 stars

The Radio Times rated this film as fair and average. The film was also reviewed in l'Unità.
