= Lyndon Township =

Lyndon Township may refer to the following places in the United States:

- Lyndon Township, Whiteside County, Illinois
- Lyndon Township, Michigan
