= James Linden =

American football coach

Coaching career (HC unless noted)
- 1921: Loyola (CA)

Head coaching record
- Overall: 6–3–1

James Y. Linden was an American college football coach. He served as the head coach at Loyola College of Los Angeles—now known as Loyola Marymount University—in 1921. He led Loyola to a 6–3–1 record.

== Head coaching record ==
Year	Team	Overall	Conference	Standing	Bowl/playoffs
Loyola Lions (Independent) (1921)
1922	Loyola	6–3–1			
Loyola:		6–3–1			
Total:		6–3–1			
