= Endangered Wildlife Trust =

South African environmental organisation

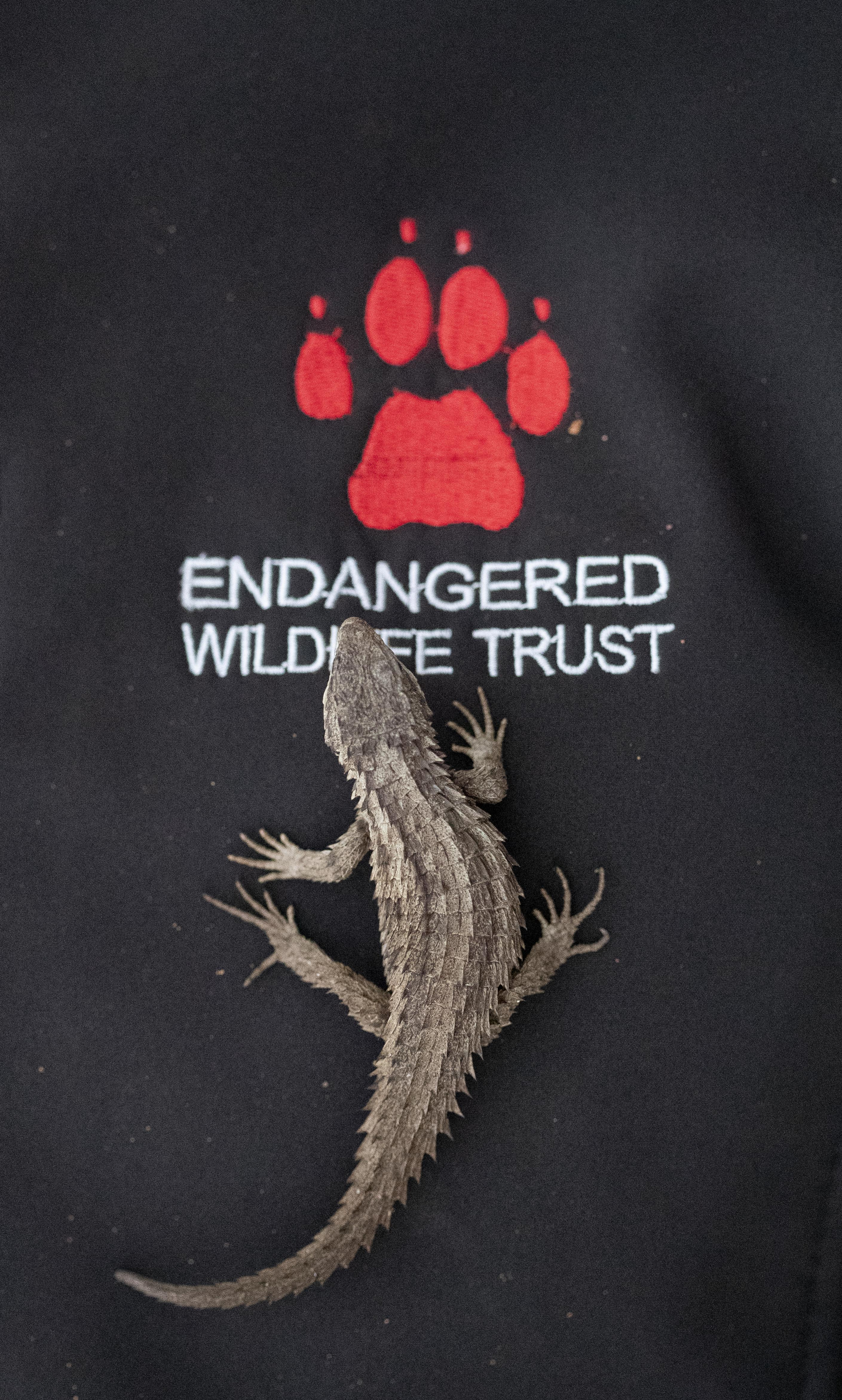
- Formation: 1973; 53 years ago
- Type: Non-profit organisation
- Purpose: Environmentalism
- Location: Midrand, South Africa
- Region served: 12 countries in Southern and East Africa
- Staff: 100+
- Website: ewt.org

The Endangered Wildlife Trust (EWT) is a non-governmental, not-for-profit South African conservation organisation. Founded in 1973, the EWT has an expanding footprint throughout southern and East Africa, focusing on the conservation of threatened species and ecosystems. The EWT implements research and conservation action programmes, implementing projects that address the threats facing species and their habitats, and support sustainable natural resource management.

== See also ==
- Ichikowitz Family Foundation
