= Lydon =

Lydon is a surname of Irish origin, an anglicization of "Loideán", and may refer to:

- Alexander Francis Lydon (1836–1917), English engraver of natural history
- Alexandra Lydon (born 1979), Irish and American television actress
- Christopher Lydon (born 1940), American media personality and author
- Don Lydon (born 1938), Irish psychologist and former politician in Ireland
- Gary Lydon (1964–2026), British-born Irish actor
- James Francis Lydon (1928–2013), Irish historian
- Jimmy Lydon (1923–2022), American movie actor and television producer
- Joe Lydon (1878–1937), American welterweight boxer
- Joe Lydon (born 1963), English rugby league footballer and rugby union coach
- John Lydon (born 1956) also known as Johnny Rotten, British rock musician
- Joseph Patrick Lydon (1878–1937), American welterweight boxer
- William A. Lydon (1863–1918), founded the Great Lakes Dredge and Dock Company
