= The Lindens =

The Lindens may refer to:

- The Lindens (Washington, D.C.), listed on the National Register of Historic Places (NRHP)
- The Lindens (Bryantown, Maryland), listed on the NRHP

== See also ==
- Linden Labs, the creators of the virtual world Second Life
- Linden (disambiguation)
