= Lyndon Stromberg =

American entrepreneur, sculptor and artist

Lyndon Dean Stromberg (born November 27, 1962) is an American entrepreneur, sculptor and artist. Works include "Our Universe" at the Smithsonian Institution, National Museum of the American Indian, "Rome" at Caesars Palace, "The World" at Winstar Casino and the "Virgin of Guadalupe" at the Dallas Cathedral Cathedral Santuario de Guadalupe.

== Companies ==
Stromberg is founder of several companies which are affiliated in the Stromberg Group. They include of 300 artisans. These include:

- Stromberg Architectural Products Inc, manufacturer of architectural shapes and castings.
- StonePly a natural stone/composite company
- Maverick Design a designer and installer of architectural castings
- Lumonyx a manufacturer of translucent glass and resin.
- Stained Glass Inc. a team of dedicated artisans creating stained glass art.
- TerraGlas a producer of architectural terra cotta sculpture and historic restoration materials.

== Sculpture and art ==
Stromberg is also a sculptor and artist known for his monumental works and architectural sculpture. Stromberg's works have appeared in the Smithsonian, The National Museum of the American Indian, The US Pentagon Building, the US Capitol Mall, Caesars Palace, The Mirage Casino, The Texas State Capitol, The Atlantis Resort and in various museums, casinos and public exhibitions. In 1999 Stromberg created the world's largest fiberglass sculpture, the “Great Hall of Waters” over the lobby of the Atlantis resort in the Bahamas. Sculptures include works in fiberglass, cast stone, marble and glass as well as various resins.

Selected architectural sculpture

- Siegfried and Roy's Secret Garden, The Mirage, Las Vegas
- Caesars Palace, Las Vegas
- Great Hall of Waters, Atlantis Paradise Island Bahamas
- Baldachin at St. Anthony Cathedral, Beaumont, Texas
- Texas fountain at Texas State Capitol
- Our Universe at the Smithsonian Institution, National Museum of the American Indian
- Americas Heroes at The Pentagon
