= Eugene Linden (conductor) =

- Born: 1912
- Origin: Chicago, Illinois, U.S.
- Died: 1983 (aged 70–71)
- Genres: Classical
- Occupation: Conductor
- Instruments: Flute, piccolo

Eugene Linden was an American conductor. He conducted the first public performance of the Tacoma Philharmonic Orchestra in March 1934 and directed the Seattle Symphony from 1948 to 1950. He is also credited as founder of the now defunct Northwest Grand Opera Company.

== Background ==
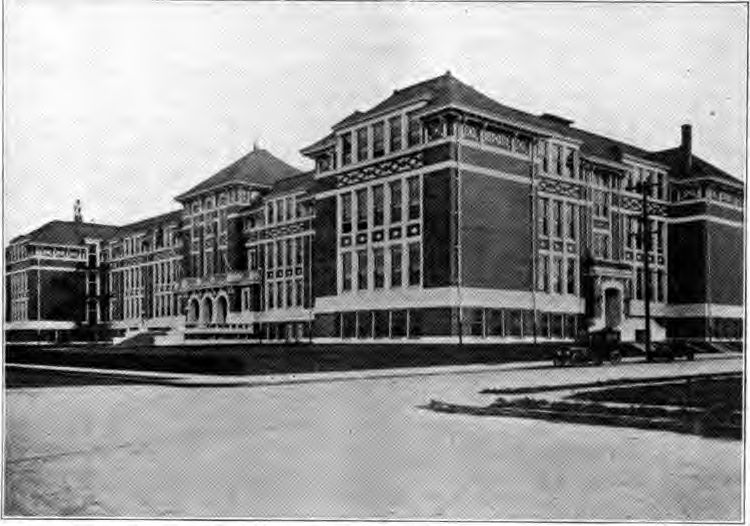
Jefferson High School in Portland, Oregon, where Linden conducted the school band

Linden was born to a musical family in Chicago in 1912. His father was Harry Linden, concertmaster of the Chicago opera orchestra, and his mother was a violinist who began playing at age twelve and was musical director at Chicago's La Salle Hotel.

Harry's four brothers were also musicians, one of which was Anthony Linden, a flautist for the San Francisco Symphony and radio soloist. According to Hilmar Grondahl of the Portland Spectator, Linden led his first orchestra when he was in grade school and knew then of his desire to be a professional conductor. Eugene attended Jefferson High School in Portland, Oregon, where he was conductor of the band. Under his leadership the ensemble placed first in three state high school contests and placed second in a fourth. In May 1930, he gained attention as conductor when the Jefferson band participated in the national high school band contest in Flint, Michigan. Of the forty-four bands competing, Eugene (then age seventeen) was the only student conductor. He received recognition and recommendation from John Philip Sousa. Eugene graduated from Jefferson High School in 1930.

== Portland Junior Symphony ==
Linden's conducting career began with the Portland Junior Symphony (PJS), the first youth orchestra in the United States (established in 1924) which later became known as the Portland Youth Philharmonic. Linden played in the orchestra for several seasons before becoming a student conductor to Jacques Gershkovitch. His conducting premiere came when he conducted Beethoven's Egmont for PJS. By 1930, Linden was promoted to the position of assistant conductor, though he continued playing flute and piccolo in the orchestra. On April 2, 1932 at age twenty, Linden conducted Edvard Grieg's "Peer Gynt" Suite No. 2 for the final concert of PJS' eighth season.

== Tacoma Philharmonic ==
In 1933, Linden hitchhiked from Portland to Tacoma, Washington at the age of twenty-one, hoping to establish an orchestra. Three musicians attended the first rehearsal. According to Linden, "No musicians would have been a failure, three was a beginning." Within a few months Linden assembled an ensemble of 65 musicians, with initial rehearsals held at Ted Brown Music Company and the Winthrop Hotel. The basement of the State Armory became the first regular rehearsal space, followed by the Scottish Rite Cathedral. The orchestra was based here until their first concert, held on March 17, 1934 at Jason Lee Intermediate School and attended by 800 guests. The concert's success prompted a second performance at the same venue on June 5.

Musicians were not paid during the first two years of the organization's existence. Linden donated his time, commuting from Portland and residing with Belle Hodges Fletcher during his time in Tacoma. The orchestra incorporated and officially adopted the name Tacoma Philharmonic, establishing a constitution and by-laws in the process. The Philharmonic performed for local servicemen often during the 1940s. In 1947, the Tacoma Philharmonic, Olympia orchestra, and Seattle Symphony united to create the short-lived Pacific Northwest Symphony Orchestra, with Linden serving as the associate conductor. From 1948 to 1950, Linden was also music director of the Seattle Symphony. However, in 1951 the Tacoma Philharmonic's board of directors decided to become a presenting organization.

In 1934, Linden was awarded the Universität Mozarteum Salzburg scholarship, allowing him the opportunity to visit Salzburg to study under conductors Bruno Walter, Arturo Toscanini and Felix Weingartner.

When asked about Scandinavian composers, Linden admitted to having an appreciation for Kurt Atterberg for being a "little like the Franck only distinctly Nordic". He also complimented Grieg for being "intensely deep" and for combining "personal warmth with an austere coldness that must be a reflection of the Norse country."
