= Alexander Wadsworth (landscape designer) =

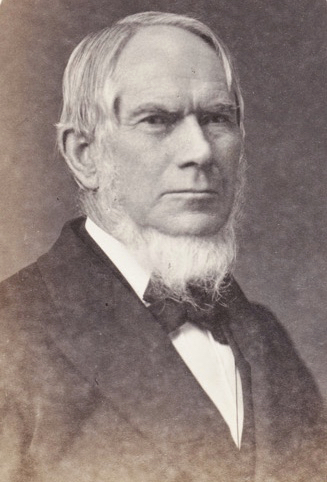

Alexander Wadsworth (1806–1898) was an American landscape architect and surveyor, best known for his work on the Mount Auburn Cemetery in Cambridge, Massachusetts. Born in Hiram, Maine, Wadsworth studied civil engineering at Gardiner Lyceum before beginning his work as a surveyor in the Boston, Massachusetts, area. He collaborated with Henry A. S. Dearborn on the topographic details of Mount Auburn Cemetery, and had a successful career designing parks and suburban subdivisions, primarily in eastern Massachusetts. Along with Francis Peabody, he also designed the Harmony Grove Cemetery in Salem, Massachusetts.

Wadsworth was a cousin of poet Henry Wadsworth Longfellow.

== See also ==
- 1876 Massachusetts legislature
- 1878 Massachusetts legislature
