= Twinity =

2008 video game

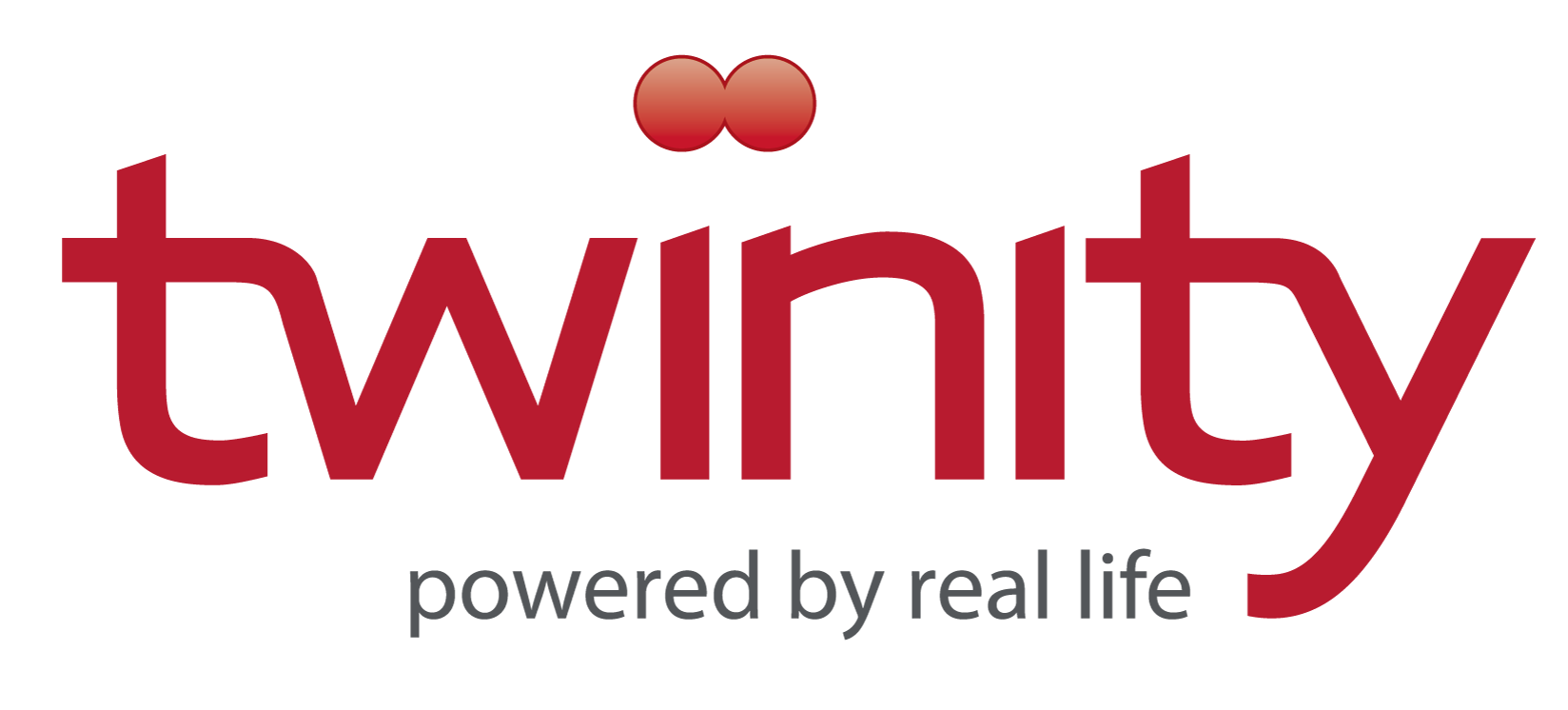
- Developers: Metaversum GmbH (former); ExitReality
- Engine: BigWorld Technology
- Platform: Microsoft Windows
- Release: September 5, 2008 (Open Beta)
- Genre: Massively multiplayer online social game
- Mode: Multiplayer

Twinity is a 3D online virtual world. Initially developed by Metaversum GmbH, it is currently held by ExitReality. The game offers its population, called Twinizens, to navigate around virtual (historical) versions of real-world cities, also called a mirror world or a Metaverse. A public beta began in September 2008, with the release of the first virtual city, Berlin, which later was followed by Singapore, London, Miami and New York. Twinity is built on BigWorld Technology and its economy is based on a free-to-play model.

Twinity is the first 3D online virtual world to incorporate true-to-scale replicas of large cities from all over the world. However, the company has recently begun to shift the focus away from a mirror world towards a more fantasy-oriented environment with locations like the Isle of Palmadora. In this respect, Twinity seems to be moving towards a Second Life-like world with more innovative features that they set up within the game, since much of user-created content is fictional and is not related to real addresses of shops and apartments. All of the game's cities were removed in January 2012. On June 8, 2012, the acquisition of Twinity by ExitReality was announced.

== World ==
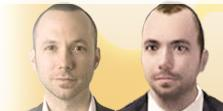
Avatar created with Photofit

=== Avatar customization ===
Twinity members represent themselves in the world where they can use their real names and create an avatar that can be customized in different ways, including the usage of a special Photofit application. Photofit allows a user to upload a real photo, which it then adapts to the measurements of an avatar face, making it resemble a picture. However, the creation of new alter egos and role play are popular among Twinity players as well.

=== Globals ===
The virtual currency used in Twinity is called "Globals". With the Globals, the Twinizens can buy clothes, furniture items, animations and pay for their own virtual apartment. Globals can be bought with credit card on the homepage, with PayPal or through Mopay. The users can also gain Globals by attending virtual contests and events, use SponsorPay or finish the welcome tour that they are offered upon registration.

=== Content ===
Twinity is based both on professional and user-generated content. Many Twinizens are content creators, developing and selling their own products in the world as well as creating their own machinima. Users also set up their own apartments, clubs, shops and lounges in which to host various events or to share with others. Starting fall 2010, all users are given starter apartments that they can furnish and decorate themselves. Users can create their own furniture or purchase pre-made items from the shops in Twinity. Additionally, a real estate agency can be found on the Twinity homepage where the Twinizens can localize an apartment of their choice. Within Twinity, an achievement system is offered, which allows users to earn profile badges related to the categories: travel, lifestyle and living.

=== Technology ===
Twinity uses next-generation texturing technologies to deliver a graphically up-to-date visual experience that can be compared to the latest game releases in the industry. This includes such engine features as normal, specular and cube maps. Screen space ambient occlusion and glow shader effects finish the final look in the post-rendering. Twinity uses 3D mapping data by Tele Atlas, which makes the virtual buildings resemble their look in the real world.

A major part of the content in Twinity is user-generated. Premium members can create 3D-objects, clothes, floor plans and animations which they upload through the Twinity client or export COLLADA files through 3D modelling tools such as SketchUp, Blender, Autodesk 3ds Max or Autodesk Maya.

Twinity uses the 3D Game Engine from BigWorld, an Australian games company for 3D virtual worlds, which was specially created for Metaversum.

== See also ==
- Active Worlds
- Blue Mars
- IMVU
- Kaneva
- Second Life
- Smeet
