= Metaversum GmbH =

German startup company behind the 3D virtual world Twinity

- Company type: Private
- Industry: Virtual worlds
- Founded: July 2006; 19 years ago
- Headquarters: Berlin, Germany
- Key people: Jochen Hummel, Dr. Mirko Caspar, Christian von Hardenberg, Jeremy Snyder (former)
- Products: Twinity and Yumondo
- Number of employees: 80 (2010)
- Website: www.metaversum.com

Metaversum GmbH was a Berlin-based startup company behind the 3D virtual world Twinity. The company was founded in July 2006, and was led by CEO Jochen Hummel, CMO Mirko Caspar and CTO Christian von Hardenberg. In 2010, the company had offices in Berlin, Kyiv and Singapore and employed around 80 people. In 2012, after problems and declining usage at Twinity, Metaversum was acquired by the internet company ExitReality.

== Products and vision ==
Metaversum was known for developing and operating the 3D mirror world Twinity as well as the former urban style sharing social network Yumondo.

The vision behind the main product Twinity had been to build realistic replicas of cities in 3D. Berlin, Singapore, London, Miami and New York City were launched in Twinity. Twinity members can create personal avatars, explore real cities virtually, move into a 3D home, or chat with a friend.

Metaversum was financially provided by international venture capitalists and Balderton Capital, formerly Benchmark Capital Europe, was one of the major investors behind Metaversum. Metaversum also previously received funding from the Interactive Digital Media Programme Office hosted at the Media Development Authority of Singapore.
