= Proteus effect =

Behavioral effect in virtual worlds

The Proteus effect describes a phenomenon in which the behavior of an individual, within virtual worlds, is changed by the characteristics of their avatar. This change is due to the individual's knowledge about the behaviors that other users who are part of that virtual environment typically associate with those characteristics. Like the adjective protean (meaning versatile or mutable), the concept's name is an allusion to the shape changing abilities of the Greek god Proteus. The Proteus effect was first introduced by researchers Nick Yee and Jeremy Bailenson at Stanford University in June 2007. It is considered an area of research concerned with the examination of the behavioral effects of changing a user's embodied avatar.

== Overview ==
The Proteus effect proposes that the visual characteristics and traits of an avatar are associated with specific behavioral stereotypes and expectations. When an individual believes that others will expect certain behaviors from them because of their avatars' appearance, they will engage in those expected behaviors. Support for the Proteus effect comes from past research in real world scenarios that has shown how certain physical characteristics, like attractiveness and height, are often associated with more positive social and professional outcomes. Moreover, experimental manipulations of these characteristics in virtual environments have shown that individuals engage in stereotype-confirming behaviors.

This is part of a larger field of research that looks at the behavior of individuals who engage in computer-mediated communication (CMC). Although CMC comes in many forms (text, audio, video, etc.), the Proteus effect is particularly relevant to CMC in which individuals interact by using avatars. This effect is driven by the increased ability to control one's appearance in an online virtual environment. Virtual world environments allow users to control many aspects of their appearance that they cannot easily change in the real world (e.g., height, weight, facial features).

== Theoretical background ==
Three psychological concepts that led to the development of the Proteus effect are behavioral confirmation, self-perception theory, and deindividuation, although since then further explanatory approaches and influencing factors such as priming and feedback loops through communication have been identified or proposed.

=== Behavioral confirmation ===
Behavioral confirmation refers to the effects that a perceiver's actions can have on the resulting behavior of an individual. Specifically, this concept proposes that interacting with individuals who hold preexisting stereotypes will lead the target of those stereotypes to engage in behaviors that will confirm the perceiver's expectations. The Proteus effect differs from behavioral confirmation in that it does not consider the actions of a perceiver. Instead, its goal is to explain how the individual's own stereotypes and expectations drives the change in behavior, independent of any social interactions that take place.

=== Self-perception theory ===
Self-perception theory states that, when internal cues are weak, individuals determine their attitudes and emotions by making external observations about both their own behavior and the circumstances that led to those behaviors. It was first introduced as an alternative to cognitive dissonance, which argued that changes in behavior can result from an individual's attempt to eliminate tension from contradicting behaviors and beliefs. A series of studies on self-perception theory that looked at changes in behavior as a result of wearing black, a color associated with negative concepts like death and evil, were influential in the development of the Proteus effect. In these studies by Mark G. Frank and Thomas Gilovich, participants who watched video recordings of sports rated NFL and NHL players wore black uniforms as being more aggressive. Furthermore, participants who were instructed to wear black jerseys reported greater preferences for engaging in aggressive behaviors against competitors. The argument across these studies was that how participants perceived themselves (i.e., wearing a color that has negative associations) led them to adopt negative behaviors. The Proteus effect carries this idea into virtual environments, where individuals see themselves as their avatar which in turn shapes their behavior.

=== Deindividuation ===
Deindividuation refers to a decrease in self-awareness and self-evaluation as a result of being part of a group. Individuals who experience deindividuation seem to be influenced to a greater degree by identity cues. In a 1979 study by Robert D. Johnson and Leslie L. Downing, participants were instructed to give an electric shock to research assistants while wearing either a KKK disguise or a nurse's uniform. The results showed that the costumes worn by participants affected the shock level that they administered to the research assistants. Johnson and Downing stated that these findings supported the argument that deindividuation increases the influence that identity cues have on individuals. In virtual environments, deindividuation is believed to be driven by the level of anonymity that this type of setting provides for its users.

== Evidence ==
A meta-analysis examining 46 quantitative experimental studies of the Proteus effect found a small-but-approaching-medium effect size that was relatively consistent (between 0.22 and 0.26), with nearly all variance explained, suggesting that the Proteus effect is reliable and sizable relative to other digital media effects.

Findings from a study that compared the appearance and behaviors of avatars in Second Life to the real world behavior and appearance of their users support the Proteus effect. In this study, participants who reported that they had designed their avatars to be more attractive also reported engaging in more confident and extraverted behavior when compared to their real world behavior. A study also found that the effects happen in the short term.

The Proteus effect has also been linked to attitude changes that reflect the stereotypes associated with their avatar's appearance. In a study by Jesse Fox, Jeremy N. Bailenson, and Liz Tricase, women were assigned avatars whose appearances were either highly sexualized or non-sexualized. While wearing a head-mounted display, participants were asked to face a virtual mirror that allowed them to see the reflection of their avatar. This was followed by a virtual conversation with a male avatar who was being controlled by the researchers. Women who used a sexualized avatar reported having more thoughts about their body image. The researchers concluded that this finding supports the Proteus effect by demonstrating that individuals internalized the sexualized aspects of their avatar's appearance, which led to greater self-objectification. Support for this conclusion comes from a similar study in which more body-related thoughts were reported by women who were asked to wear a swimsuit when compared to women who were only asked to try on a shirt while facing a mirror. There are also studies that suggest how the use of avatars decrease stereotypes about elderly groups.

Further support for the Proteus effect comes from a series of studies that used avatars to increase the amount of exercise performed by individuals. Across three studies, the results consistently showed that participants were more likely to increase their level of physical activity after observing an avatar engage in those behaviors and be rewarded for them. One major difference in this study is that the effects that avatars had on participants' behavior depended on how much the avatar resembled the user. This difference was tested by assigning some users avatars that had been created using photographs of their actual faces.

The Proteus effect has also been used to explain successful replications of the work by Frank and Gilovich (1988) and Johnson and Downing (1979). The results of two studies by Jorge Peña, Jeffrey T. Hancock, and Nicholas A. Merola found that attitude towards aggressive behavior in a virtual setting was increased in individuals who used avatars wearing black cloaks or clothing that resembled KKK uniforms. The researchers argued that the negative associations related to the avatar's appearance changed the user's attitudes. Additionally, the researchers suggested that priming, in addition to self-perception theory, could explain the Proteus effect.

Recent studies demonstrated the Proteus effect in real-life contexts outside laboratory conditions. In a study, 13.6 million League Of Legends in-game chat messages were analysed, and found players' avatars influenced their mode of communication, specifically in: vocality, valence, toxicity.

== Development ==
In 2009, Peña and colleagues proposed priming mechanisms to explain the Proteus effect, challenging Yee and Bailenson's original account of self-perception theory. In their view, stereotypes associated with avatars (e.g. a slim figure) simultaneously activate related attitudes (e.g. athleticism) and inhibit opposing ones (e.g. being sedentary), increasing the likelihood of users behaving in line with their avatars' characteristics. In their study, participants exposed to avatars wearing Ku Klux Klan robes (as opposed to doctor avatars) wrote more aggressive stories and showed less group cohesion. The authors suggested that the avatars' negative stereotypes primed violent attitudes for users. While not refuting self-perception explanations, they claimed priming mechanisms were more parsimonious.

Later, Yee and Bailenson found that the Proteus effect was amplified by greater avatar embodiment, showing this by presenting videos of moving avatars, rather than static mirror images. They argued that priming accounts assume all external stimuli activate concepts with uniform strength, which cannot explain why higher embodiment strengthens the Proteus effect. In contrast, as self-perception theory treats avatars as extensions of users' physical selves, greater embodiment would influence their attitudes and behavior more strongly.

In 2016, Ratan and Dawson offered a reconciliatory explanation: the avatar first primes relevant concepts, which embodiment then makes personally salient. Together, this builds "avatar self-relevance" - the extent to which avatars closely represent and relate to users, which determines the magnitude of "avatar use effects" - including the Proteus effect. In their study, stronger avatar self-similarity, measured by gender consistency and emotional attachment with avatars, induced stronger negative reactions when participants' avatars were harmed. From these results, the authors proposed avatar self-similarity as a "middle ground between self-perception and priming-oriented explanations".

== Embodiment ==
Studies have found users' level of embodiment in avatars to influence the strength of the Proteus effect. Researchers from the Massachusetts Institute of Technology (MIT) proposed a definition specific to virtual environments, comprising:

- Self-location (feeling present in the avatar).
- Agency (feeling control over the avatar's actions).
- Body ownership (feeling the avatar's body belongs to oneself).

For example, using avatars dressed in sports clothes (compared to formal wear) generally increased cardiovascular exercise output, as measured by faster heart rate. This effect became even stronger when the avatars incorporated participants' facial features, which enhanced embodiment through a sense of body ownership. Similarly, in offline settings, research also found that higher embodiment strengthens the Proteus effect. In one study, participants assigned to heroic or villainous avatars later displayed more prosocial and antisocial behavior, respectively, in face-to-face tasks. These effects were amplified when participants actively controlled avatars in virtual reality, rather than passively observing them. However, some studies found no impact of embodiment on the Proteus effect. Some researchers suggested that in intervention studies, even when personally distant avatars were designed to minimise embodiment, participants still managed to form personal attachments with them. This results in similar embodiment levels and Proteus effect magnitudes across experimental conditions.

== Extension to offline behavior ==
The Proteus effect has been found to influence offline behavior after engaging with virtual avatars. In a study, participants who used tall, attractive avatars to play video games, later negotiated more aggressively and assertively with confederates during face-to-face interactions. Other demonstrations were found in studies about prosocial behavior, in which participants using hero avatars (Superman) allocated more pleasant food (chocolate) subsequently when offline, reflecting prosocial behavior, while those using villain avatars (Voldemort) allocated more unpleasant food (chilli sauce), reflecting antisocial behavior.

The duration of the Proteus effect's offline influence is found to be short-lived. In one virtual reality study, participants using older avatars (compared to young) walked slower. This effect briefly persisted when participants were instructed to walk through a corridor offline, but diminished halfway. The authors concluded with "fast post-embodiment decay rates for behavioral changes". While mechanisms behind the Proteus effect's "temporal extends" remain unclear, some researchers have proposed that prolonged attitude changes may help to extend these behavioral outcomes.

== Practical applications ==
Studies have found that leveraging avatars with pre-existing stereotypes can promote beneficial behavior.

=== Pain attenuation ===
Using avatars with muscular properties were found to reduce pain sensitivity in participants, by activating attitudes towards pain resistance. Adding tactile feedback can further increase embodiment levels (via "ownership of virtual hands"), thereby enhancing pain attenuation effects. The authors described this as "comparable to moderate dose of hydromorphone", and underlined the potential of conducting "avatar therapy for chronic pain" in future clinical practice.

=== Enhancing performance ===
Adopting avatars that users perceive to be skilled was found to enhance real performance in different fields, for example:

- Cognitive performance (executive functions) increased when users adopted Albert Einstein avatars during virtual simulation tasks.
- Creativity improved when engineers used avatars representing their "ideal innovator" during virtual and later face-to-face brainstorming.
- Music proficiency in West African drumming increased when users experienced an illusory ownership of dark-skinned hands.

=== Self-esteem ===
Using avatars with omnipotent characteristics (eg. a Christian God) was found to raise positive self-attitudes of users, including (1) promoting confidence in abilities, and (2) reducing feelings of vulnerability. This effect also translated to lower physiological threat responses (lower heart rate) when participants faced alarming situations in virtual games.

== Negative implications ==
=== Gaming addiction ===
Although avatar embodiment induces stronger Proteus effects with positive applications, it could also weaken users' internal attitudes, as they increase reliance on external cues from avatars to infer their self-concept. This has been linked to disordered gaming addiction, and indirectly, to further implications of inactive lifestyles.

=== Real world aggression ===
Some avatars carry negative stereotypes, which could result in harmful behavior when users infer attitudes from them. A study found that white-skinned participants using dark-skinned avatars displayed more aggression during intergroup situations in virtual games. This extended to offline environments, where they reported stronger motivations to harm real-life partners afterwards.

== See also ==
- Self-fulfilling prophecy
- Social identity model of deindividuation effects
- Virtual Human Interaction Lab
- Stanford prison experiment
