= Vivere =

Vivere may refer to:

- Vivere Entertainment SA, a company which operates Virgin Megastores in Greece
- The Best of Andrea Bocelli: Vivere, an album by Andrea Bocelli
- Vivere (TV series), an Italian television series
- "Vivere" (song), a song written by Cesare Andrea Bixio
- Vivere! (1936 film), an Italian film directed by Guido Brignone
- Vivere (2019 film), an Italian film directed by Francesca Archibugi
- Viverse, a metaverse platform created by HTC VIVE
