= Whyville =

Educational Internet site

- Website type: Virtual world serious games
- Owner: Numedeon
- Creator: Numedeon
- Launched: February 1999; 27 years ago
- Written in: Java Flash HTML5

Whyville is an educational Internet site geared towards children aged 8–14, founded and managed by Numedeon Inc. Whyville engages its uses in learning about a broad range of topics, including science, business, art and geography. Whyville's users (Whyvillians) engage in virtual world simulation based games and role play sponsored by a wide range of governmental, non-profit, and corporate entities. In 2009, the website had a registered base of more than 7 million users.

Whyville was launched in 1999, by Numedeon Inc, which was founded by Dr. James M. Bower, his students, and collaborators at the California Institute of Technology. They were interested in whether simulation-based serious gaming could change education, and Whyville's purpose remains primarily educational.

== Whyville's interactive structure ==
Whyville was one of the first virtual worlds built around learning games. Whyville was also one of the first virtual worlds which used an internal virtual currency. Users earn a 'clam' salary based on their educational activities on the site. With these clams they can buy face parts, projectiles, furniture, bricks, and other virtual goods and services that enhance their life in the Whyville virtual world. In 2007, Whyville partnered with the Spanish Bank Bankinter to build a virtual banking system for Whyville's users through which they manage their clam assets

Whyville was also one of the first sites to emphasize user created content. Tied directly to the clam economy, once a user has accumulated a large enough clam savings, they can start their own Whyville virtual business based on their own created content. Most of these businesses are built around the construction of 'face parts' from which users make their own avatars, using simple pixel by pixel drawing tools. Other businesses design and sell decals for users' virtual Scions (virtual automobiles in Whyville sponsored by Scion owned by Toyota). Players must draw their creations by hand. There is no copying and pasting, and all contributed content is reviewed by site staff for appropriateness. Since the site's launch, thousands of players have created millions of face parts.

A weekly newspaper called "The Whyville Times" comes out every Sunday. Whyvillians send in articles that they have written to the Times Editor. If the article is published, other users may comment about it on the Bulletin Board System (BBS).

== Online safety ==
Whyville received awards in 2006, 2007, and 2008 from iParenting as the best website for kids, and the best on the web for its safety features. In 2008 Whyville received a NAPPA (National Parenting Publication Award) Gold Award as a site that represented the best in its genre for kids

== In education ==
Whyville has been involved in numerous projects involving schools. For example, Whyville has sponsored several workforce pipeline projects that aim to encourage children to consider technical and scientific careers.

In another example, National Science Foundation awarded funding to ETR Associates to implement a project through middle school classrooms to engage young Hispanic women in computer game design and entrepreneurship.

The Texas Workforce Commission has also funded Whyville to develop workforce related games in advanced manufacturing, biotechnology and energy. In the 2007-2008 school year, Waco Independent School District piloted integration of Whyville into school day activities and creating lesson plans in more than fifty classrooms with over 1,000 students. In April, 2008, as part of its work with the Texas Workforce Commission, Whyville launched a new initiative for teachers called the WhyTexas Challenge. Over three weeks, 300 teachers in Texas signed their students up to compete for their classrooms. The winners, from the Waco Independent school district amassed more than 17,000 clams in the three-week period of time.

== Educational research ==
Whyville has drawn attention from educational researchers interested in the effect of virtual worlds on children. The John D. and Catherine T. MacArthur Foundation funded research into how preteens explore and share information about reproductive health using Whyville.

Educational Research on Whyville has now been published in the book "Connected Play: Tweens in a Virtual World" Authored by Yasmin B. Kafai, Deborah A. Fields, and Mizuko Ito.

== Sponsorships ==
Whyville has an extensive list of both public and private sponsors. Examples include NASA the US Centers for Disease Control and Prevention the J. Paul Getty Trust, Disney, EMI, the Woods Hole Oceanographic Institution, Scholastic Publishing the John D. and Catherine T. MacArthur Foundation, Next Generation Learning Challenges, the US Department of Labor, the Texas Workforce Commission, and Chicago's Field Museum of Natural History. Whyville's corporate sponsors include Scion, which launched its first virtual world presence in Whyville.

Whyville also has an extensive virtual nutrition project sponsored by the University of Texas System and The School Nutrition Association. In this project, Whyville's citizens elect to eat breakfast, lunch, and dinner each day, and a nutrition calculator then determines their state of health.

Whyville also has games and activities focusing on environmental issues supported by organizations like the Woods Hole Oceanographic Institution.

Whyville has also recently worked with the Concord Consortium to implement a series of games based on breeding dragons as a way to learn genetics.

== Technical foundation for Whyville ==
Whyville runs on N.I.C.E, Numedeon's Interactive Community Engine. Nice is an online platform that supports the construction and management of immersive virtual worlds. Core components of this engine are protected by U.S. Patents N.I.C.E., and therefore Whyville runs on a standard web browser, and can be run with as little as 56K baud connectivity".
