= Dialogue tree =

Gameplay mechanic

An example of a simple dialogue tree

A dialogue tree, or conversation tree, is a gameplay mechanic that is used throughout many adventure games (including action-adventure games) and role-playing video games. When interacting with a non-player character, the player is given a choice of what to say and makes subsequent choices until the conversation ends. Certain video game genres, such as visual novels and dating sims, revolve almost entirely around these character interactions and branching dialogues.

== History ==
The concept of the dialogue tree has existed long before the advent of video games. The earliest known dialogue tree is described in "The Garden of Forking Paths", a 1941 short story by Jorge Luis Borges, in which the combination book of Ts'ui Pên allows all major outcomes from an event branch into their own chapters. Much like the game counterparts this story reconvenes as it progresses (as possible outcomes would approach n^{m} where n is the number of options at each fork and m is the depth of the tree).

The first computer dialogue system was featured in ELIZA, a primitive natural language processing computer program written by Joseph Weizenbaum between 1964 and 1966. The program emulated interaction between the user and an artificial therapist. With the advent of video games, interactive entertainment have attempted to incorporate meaningful interactions with virtual characters. Branching dialogues have since become a common feature in visual novels, dating sims, adventure games, and role-playing video games.

== Game mechanisms ==
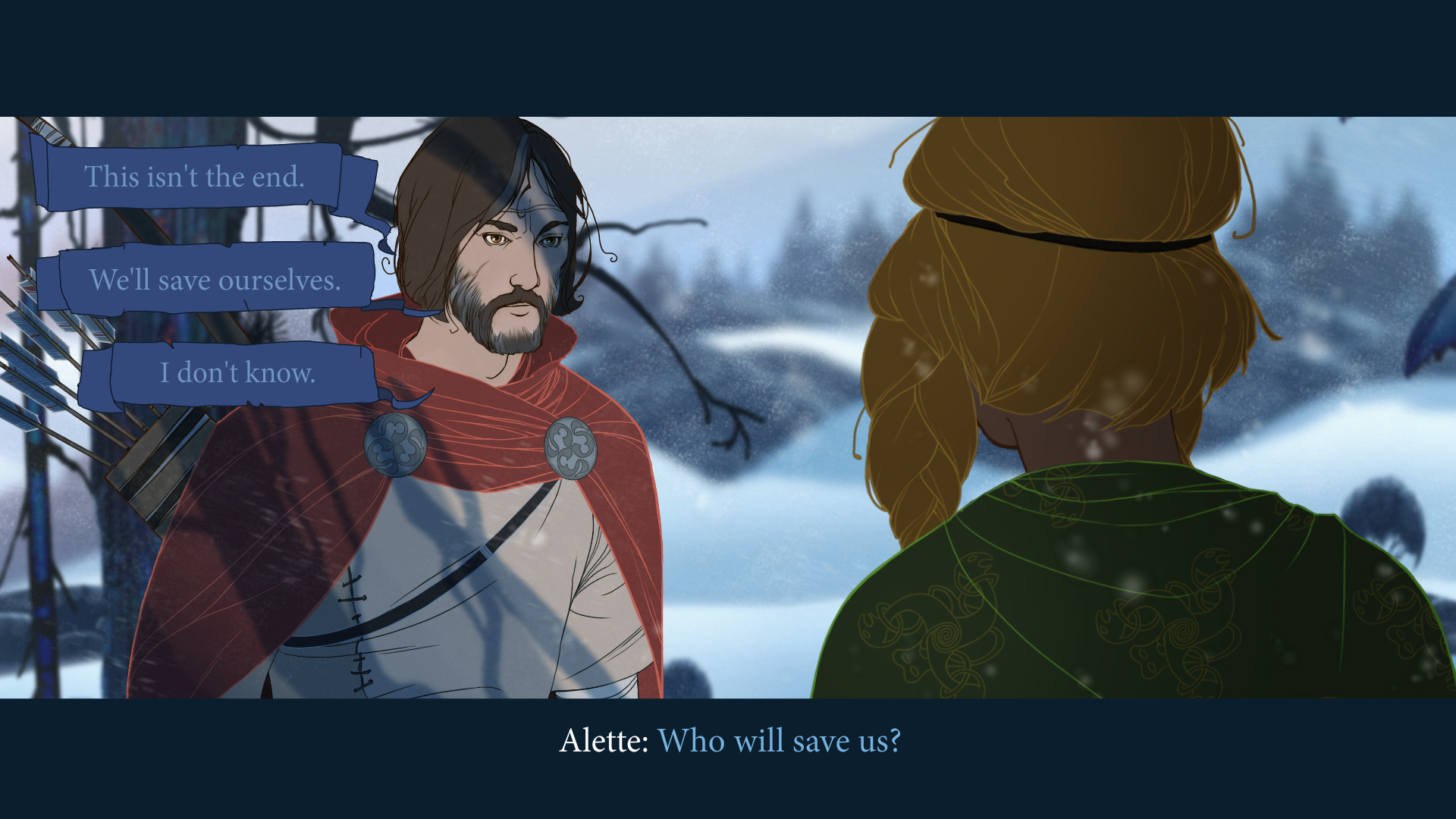
A dialogue tree as implemented in the game The Banner Saga: the query from the non-player character appears at the bottom, and three possible player responses at the upper left.

The player typically enters the gameplay mode by choosing to speak with a non-player character (or when a non-player character chooses to speak to them), and then choosing a line of pre-written dialog from a menu. Upon choosing what to say, the non-player character responds to the player, and the player is given another choice of what to say. This cycle continues until the conversation ends. The conversation may end when the player selects a farewell message, the non-player character has nothing more to add and ends the conversation, or when the player makes a bad choice (perhaps angering the non-player to leave the conversation).

Games often offer options to ask non-players to reiterate information about a topic, allowing players to replay parts of the conversation that they did not pay close enough attention to the first time. These conversations are said to be designed as a tree structure, with players deciding between each branch of dialog to pursue. Unlike a branching story, players may return to earlier parts of a conversation tree and repeat them. Each branch point (or node) is essentially a different menu of choices, and each choice that the player makes triggers a response from the non-player character followed by a new menu of choices.

In some genres such as role-playing video games, external factors such as charisma may influence the response of the non-player character or unlock options that would not be available to other characters. These conversations can have far-reaching consequences, such as deciding to disclose a valuable secret that has been entrusted to the player. However, these are usually not real tree data structure in programmers sense, because they contain cycles as can be seen on illustration on this page.

Certain game genres revolve almost entirely around character interactions, including visual novels such as Ace Attorney and dating sims such as Tokimeki Memorial, usually featuring complex branching dialogues and often presenting the player's possible responses word-for-word as the player character would say them. Games revolving around relationship-building, including visual novels, dating sims such as Tokimeki Memorial, and some role-playing games such as Shin Megami Tensei: Persona, often give choices that have a different number of associated "mood points" which influence a player character's relationship and future conversations with a non-player character. These games often feature a day-night cycle with a time scheduling system that provides context and relevance to character interactions, allowing players to choose when and if to interact with certain characters, which in turn influences their responses during later conversations. Some games use a real-time conversation system, giving the player only a few seconds to respond to a non-player character, such as Sega's Sakura Wars and Alpha Protocol.

Another variation of branching dialogues can be seen in the adventure game Culpa Innata, where the player chooses a tactic at the beginning of a conversation, such as using either a formal, casual or accusatory manner, that affects the tone of the conversation and the information gleaned from the interviewee.

=== Dialogue wheel ===
A dialogue wheel is a radial user interface used to display and select responses within a dialogue tree. Whereas a dialogue tree describes the underlying structure of a branching conversation, a dialogue wheel concerns how the available branches are presented to the player. Instead of displaying each possible response in full, a wheel may use shortened paraphrases, symbols or labels indicating the intended tone. Game writer Alexander Freed wrote that the presentation of dialogue options can affect both immersion and the player's emotional response: symbols and abbreviated descriptions may be understood more quickly than complete lines, but can also cause players to misinterpret the writer's intended response.

The interface became particularly associated with BioWare's role-playing games. Electronic Arts filed a United States patent application for a "graphical interface for interactive dialog" in 2007, claiming priority to an application filed in 2006; the patent was granted in 2011. The patented system assigns dialogue responses to directional slots and repeatedly places responses associated with the same emotional or conversational category in consistent positions. Its stated purpose was to allow players to select responses more rapidly and reduce the amount of text that must be read during a simulated conversation. The patent acknowledged radial menus as an existing type of interface; its claims focused more specifically on the consistent association between directional positions and classes of dialogue. Patent law publication Patent Arcade identified versions of the interface in the Mass Effect and Dragon Age series, in which friendly, neutral or hostile responses were generally assigned to recurring areas of the wheel.

In the original Mass Effect trilogy, the wheel displays paraphrases of the responses subsequently spoken by the voiced protagonist. Colour, symbols and position communicate whether a response is generally diplomatic, aggressive, neutral, investigative or romantic. Linguists Stephanie Rennick and Seán Roberts observed that the Mass Effect and Dragon Age wheels generally place options which advance the conversation on the right, while options on the left allow the player to request further information or clarification. They argued that this arrangement gives players some control over the pace and depth of exposition. They also noted that Mass Effect permits players to select certain responses before another character has finished speaking, reducing pauses between conversational turns.

== Value and impact ==
The dialogue tree mechanism allows game designers to provide interactive conversations with nonplayer characters without having to tackle the challenges of natural language processing in the field of artificial intelligence. In games such as Monkey Island, these conversations can help demonstrate the personality of certain characters.

Scholars Jaakko Stenros and Tanja Sihvonen described the dialogue wheel as a principal means through which players perform a chosen role in the Mass Effect and Dragon Age games. Choices made through the interface may affect the player character's personality, relationships, game world and subsequent narrative options. The format has nevertheless been criticised for obscuring exactly what the player character will say and for reducing complex characterisation to a small number of predetermined emotional categories. Writing for PC Gamer, Harvey Randall argued that vague prompts and strongly signposted personality types could restrict player agency and cause the spoken response to differ from what the player believed they had selected.

== See also ==
- Digital conversation
- Flowchart
- Sierra Entertainment
