= Meez =

Former social media network

- Website type: Avatar
- Dissolved: December 2017
- Headquarters: San Francisco, California
- Owner: Donnerwood Media
- Key people: Sean Ryan (founder)
- Website: www.meez.com
- Commercial: No
- Registration: Required
- Launched: March 28, 2006
- Current status: Defunct

Meez was a free-to-play virtual world that launched on March 28, 2006. Meez was developed by Donnerwood Media (a company based in San Francisco, California, that were also the license-holders for Tringo) as an "online entertainment" social networking service. It was founded by Sean Ryan, the former vice president of the music service RealNetworks. Meez's CEO, John Cahill, was a former Yahoo executive.

Meez's main draw was the Meez Nation, where users could visit several regions, known as "Hoods", to chat with other users in chat rooms. Meez had over three million unique users, who would spend 60 hours a month on the site. There were 13 million registered Meez users by the time the site had become discontinued, 90% of whom were in the United States. Meez advertisers included Nike, Rocawear, Domo, Coast, the NBA and the NHL. MIS Quarterly estimated that its users were primarily children and teenagers.

In 2007, Meez was named one of the Internet's five worst websites by TIME.

== Shut down ==
Meez went offline in December 2017, with no warning to its users, and its site domain later expired in March 2018. Donnerwood Media has not given any statements about how or why Meez was taken offline.
