= Virtual Human Interaction Lab =

Stanford Virtual Human Interaction Lab
- Established: 2003
- Field of research: Virtual reality
- Director: Jeremy Bailenson
- Address: McClatchy Hall, Building 120; 450 Serra Mall; Stanford, CA 94309; USA
- Location: Stanford, California, United States
- Nickname: VHIL
- Operating agency: Stanford University
- Website: Official Website

The Virtual Human Interaction Lab (VHIL) at Stanford University. It was founded in 2003 by Jeremy Bailenson, associate professor of communication at Stanford University. The lab conducts research for the Communication Department.

== History ==
Its founding director was Stanford professor Jeremy Bailenson. As of April 2014, it had an advanced virtual reality lab and setup, which was used to teach visitors and students on various topics. The company's VR software is "free to any interested organization." According to the Los Angeles Times, it is at the "forefront" of the [virtual reality content] movement" in 2015, at which point Jeremy Bailenson remained the head of the organization.

== VR projects ==
- The Crystal Reef (2016) - Premiered at the 2016 Tribeca Film Festival. It was later featured by TIME. It is a 360-degree video VR experience about ocean acidification.
- The Stanford Ocean Acidification Experience (2016) - Also called SOAE, the "experience" premiered at the Tribeca 2016 Film Festival (then-called The Crystal Reef: Interactive) in conjunction with the 360 video. SOAE allows users to become a scientist and interact with their environment. SOAE has been exhibited at the US Senate and the Palau National Congress.
- Becoming Homeless: A Human Experience (2017) - Premiered at the 2017 Tribeca Film Festival, it was originally developed for the lab's "Empathy At Scale" research project.
- Coral Compass: Fighting Climate Change in Palau (2018) - world premiere at the Tribeca Film Festival in 2018. Viewers travel to Palau, looking at how the country is working with scientists to adapt to climate change.

== Research ==
=== Current ===
- Digital anonymity - in 2010, the group was studying how digital media users who anonymize themselves via their avatars may be perceived differently from media users who use avatars that resemble their physical world selves.
- Mediators and mimicry - researching how online dispute resolution (ODR) may help mediators strike a delicate balance between developing rapport and maintaining impartiality.
- Out-of-body experience - studies self-presence, or an out-of-body experience.
- Augmented perspective taking - researching how immersion and interactivity can enhance the ability to understand other minds and how the virtual experience can influence our attitudes and behaviors.
- Self-endorsing - researches how using the self as the source of persuasive messages can influence attitudes and behaviors in various persuasive contexts.
- Automatic facial feature detection and analyses - this methodology uses just a small webcam and computer software to predict an individual's errors and performance quality based only on facial features that are tracked and logged automatically.

=== Former topics ===
The lab has studied topics such as:

- Proteus effect
- Transformed social interaction
- Facial Identity Capture and Presidential Candidate Preference - it was found that by morphing a subject's face in a 40:60 ratio with that of John Kerry and George W. Bush, the subject was more likely to prefer the candidate that shared their features. This study has implications concerning the use of a voter's image and overall face morphing during national elections to sway a voter's decision.
- Virtual aging's effect on financial decisions
- Eye witness testimony and virtual police lineups - In collaboration with the Research Center for Virtual Environments and Behavior, the National Science Foundation, and the Federal Judicial Center, VHIL examined the capabilities of pointing out witnesses during a police lineup while in a virtual environment.
- Diversity simulation - allowing participants to experience another race or gender
