= Point man (disambiguation) =

A point man is a soldier in the front of a military advance.

Point man may also refer to:

- Point Man, a 2019 Vietnam War film
- Point Man, a character in the video game F.E.A.R.
- Pointman, a television series
- Pointman (user interface), device used to control one's avatar
