= Avatars United =

Web community

- Founded: Enemy Unknown
- Dissolved: October 2010
- Owner: Linden Lab
- Website: avatarsunited.net
- Launched: March 2008
- Current status: Defunct

Avatars United was a web community for avatars of online games and virtual worlds. It was launched in March 2008 by Sweden-based Enemy Unknown and closed in October 2010. It was owned by Linden Lab, which announced its closure on September 23, 2010.

== Features ==
At the core, Avatars United is a social networking website that lets users connect their game avatars with each other. Avatars can interact and share experiences by sending messages, blogging, discussing topics and uploading photos and videos. They can also join or create groups and organize in-game events. As to keep the website to in-game content only, any real-life content or references to real-life identities are strictly forbidden.

Avatars are organized by the server they belong to, called "worlds" on the website. Each world has a dedicated page where users can track the activity of its avatars. Users can register an unlimited amount of avatars from multiple worlds and games and designate one as their main avatar. This allows users to keep in touch with friends from past games as they migrate to new ones.

To log in the user is required to fill out one's real-life birth date. It is not clear whether this information will be public or not.

== Supported games ==
Avatars United currently supports 90 virtual worlds. The website also integrates with official game resources such as the World of Warcraft Armory and EVE Online API.

== History ==
The project was initiated by a group of real-life childhood friends with a passion for computer games in the summer of 2007.

The company was acquired by Linden Lab in 2010.

Linden Lab closed Avatars United in September 2010, integrating the underlying social technology into Second Life.

== See also ==
- Massively multiplayer online game
- Massively multiplayer online role-playing game
- Guild hosting
