= Upinder Singh Bhalla =

Indian computational neuroscientist

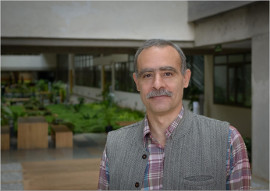
- Born: 21 June 1963 (age 63)
- Education: California Institute of Technology; University of Cambridge
- Known for: Computational and experimental studies on neuronal and Synaptic signalling
- Awards: 2007 Shanti Swarup Bhatnagar Prize
- Scientific career
- Fields: Computational neuroscience
- Workplaces: National Centre for Biological Sciences
- Doctoral advisor: James M. Bower; Ravi Iyengar

Upinder Singh Bhalla (born 1963) is an Indian computational neuroscientist, academic and a professor at National Centre for Biological Sciences of the Tata Institute of Fundamental Research. He is known for his studies on neuronal and synaptic signalling in memory and olfactory coding using computational and experimental methods and is an elected fellow of the Indian Academy of Sciences and the Indian National Science Academy. The Council of Scientific and Industrial Research, the apex agency of the Government of India for scientific research, awarded him the Shanti Swarup Bhatnagar Prize for Science and Technology, one of the highest Indian science awards, in 2007, for his contributions to biological sciences. The Infosys Science Foundation awarded him the Infosys Prize 2017 in Life Sciences for his pioneering contributions to the understanding of the brain's computational machinery.

== Biography ==
Upinder S. Bhalla, born in the Indian capital of Delhi to an academic couple who were professors at Jawaharlal Nehru University, enrolled himself at the Indian Institute of Technology, Kanpur for an integrated master's program but discontinued his studies at IITK after one year to join Cambridge University from where he graduated in natural sciences. Subsequently, he secured a PhD under the guidance of James M. Bower from California Institute of Technology in 1993 and did his post doctoral studies at the laboratory of Ravi Iyengar at Mount Sinai School of Medicine. Returning to India, he joined National Centre for Biological Sciences, a Bengaluru-based biological research centre of Tata Institute of Fundamental Research where he became an assistant professor in 2002 and an associate professor in 2003, before becoming a professor in 2012. He heads a laboratory at NCBS where he hosts a number of research associates, post-doctoral fellows and doctoral students who are involved in the research on Memory and Plasticity through computational and experimental methods.

== Legacy ==
Bhalla's research has widened our understanding of memory functioning and he has contributed to understanding the neural coding of olfactory information. His team at NCBS uses optogenetic techniques for monitoring brain cell activity and uses light to stimulate the activity. Bhalla and his colleagues developed MOOSE (Multiscale Object-Oriented Simulation Environment), a simulation tool which helps build computer models of molecules and molecular networks. He has mentored several research scholars in their doctoral and post-doctoral studies and is a member of the council of the Indian National Science Academy.

== Awards and honours ==
Bhalla received the Shanti Swarup Bhatnagar Prize of the Council of Scientific and Industrial Research in 2007 for his contributions to Biological Sciences. The same year, the Indian Academy of Sciences elected him as their fellow. Three years later, he also became an elected fellow of the Indian National Science Academy. In 2017, he received the Infosys Prize in Life Sciences for the excellent work he has been doing for the last two decades which is now not only nationally but internationally recognised as one of the fundamental ways of how we study the role of olfaction in behaviour. In 2018, Bhalla became a laureate of the Asian Scientist 100 by the Asian Scientist.

== Selected bibliography ==
- Upinder Singh Bhalla (July 2011). "Trafficking Motifs as the Basis for Two-Compartment Signaling Systems to Form Multiple Stable States". Biophys. J. 101 (1): 21–32. Bibcode:2011BpJ...101...21B. doi:10.1016/j.bpj.2011.05.037. PMC 3127183. PMID 21723811.
- Bhattacharyya U, Bhalla US (December 2015). "Robust and Rapid Air-Borne Odor Tracking without Casting". eNeuro. 2 (6): ENEURO.0102–15.2015. doi:10.1523/ENEURO.0102-15.2015. PMC 4674010. PMID 26665165.
- Ray S, Chintaluri C, Bhalla US, Wójcik DK (April 2016). "NSDF: Neuroscience Simulation Data Format". Neuroinformatics. 14 (2): 147–67. doi:10.1007/s12021-015-9282-5. PMC 4823348. PMID 26585711.
- Gilra A, Bhalla US (May 2015). "Bulbar microcircuit model predicts connectivity and roles of interneurons in odor coding". PLOS ONE. 10 (5) e0098045. Bibcode:2015PLoSO..1098045G. doi:10.1371/journal.pone.0098045. PMC 4420273. PMID 25942312.
- Gupta P, Albeanu DF, Bhalla US (February 2015). "Olfactory bulb coding of odors, mixtures and sniffs is a linear sum of odor time profiles". Nat. Neurosci. 18 (2): 272–81. doi:10.1038/nn.3913. PMID 25581362. S2CID 205437247.
- Jain P, Bhalla US (May 2014). "Transcription control pathways decode patterned synaptic inputs into diverse mRNA expression profiles". PLOS ONE. 9 (5) e95154. Bibcode:2014PLoSO...995154J. doi:10.1371/journal.pone.0095154. PMC 4006808. PMID 24787753.
- Bhalla US (April 2014). "Molecular computation in neurons: a modeling perspective". Curr Opin Neurobiol. 25: 31–7. doi:10.1016/j.conb.2013.11.006. PMID 24709598. S2CID 22243389.
- Modi MN, Dhawale AK, Bhalla US (March 2014). "CA1 cell activity sequences emerge after reorganization of network correlation structure during associative learning". eLife. 3 e01982. doi:10.7554/eLife.01982. PMC 3964823. PMID 24668171.
- Bhalla US (2014). "Multiscale modeling and synaptic plasticity". Prog Mol Biol Transl Sci. Progress in Molecular Biology and Translational Science. 123: 351–86. doi:10.1016/B978-0-12-397897-4.00012-7. ISBN 978-0-12-397897-4. PMID 24560151.
- Bhatia A, Moza S, Bhalla US (2019). "Precise excitation-inhibition balance controls gain and timing in the hippocampus". eLife. 8. doi:10.7554/eLife.43415. PMC 6517031. PMID 31021319.

== See also ==
- James M. Bower
- Ravi Iyengar
