= Smeet =

- Developer: Smeet Communications GmbH
- Publisher: Smeet Communications GmbH
- Platform: Browser App
- Release: 2007 (Spain) 2008 (United Kingdom) 2008 (Greece) 2009 (France) 2009 (Italy) 2010 (Poland) 2010 (United States) 2010 (Turkey) 2010 (Sweden) 2011 (Lithuania) 2017 (Portugal) 2020
- Genre: Social game
- Mode: Multiplayer

Smeet is a discontinued browser-based virtual world video game developed in Berlin, Germany. Smeet is a browser based 3D social multiplayer online game. The game was developed by Smeet Communications GmbH.

== History ==
In January 2011, Smeet reached around six million subscribers and was translated into twelve different languages. In November 2023, it was announced Smeet is closing down and ending service. January 5, 2024 the sMeet game was closed.

== Gameplay ==
Players can choose from several themed quizzes and minigames or complete tasks and games, generating Fame Points through the leveling system. Players can also buy pets, plants, and fantasy creatures that they can feed and water, causing them to grow over time.

Users can create and customize their profiles and avatars, earn “Fame Points”, and progress to higher levels. With increasing numbers of Fame Points and levels, users gain a higher social status and can receive additional content.

Smeet can be played from Microsoft Windows, Mac OS, Android, or iPhone.

== Partnership and projects ==
Smeet has numerous partner projects with brands including RTL (Bertelsmann), Endemol, and Bravo. Smeet also enables a social viewing feature via the integration of videos with user-generated content. The videos are mainly streamed from video-sharing websites such as YouTube, but there have also been partnerships with national television channels.

== See also ==
- IMVU
