= James M. Bower =

American neuroscientist (born 1954)

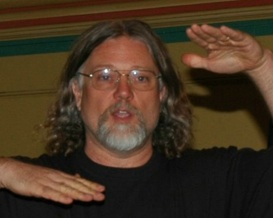
- James M. Bower, 2004
- Born: February 17, 1954 (age 72); Northampton, Massachusetts, U.S.
- Education: Montana State University, Bozeman; University of Wisconsin at Madison; New York University Medical Center
- Scientific career
- Fields: Computational Neuroscience and Neurophysiology
- Doctoral advisor: Wally Welker; Lew Haberly; Rodolfo Llinas
- Doctoral students: Upinder Singh Bhalla; Mitra Hartmann; Michael Hasselmo

James Mason Bower (born February 17, 1954) is an American neuroscientist and CEO and chairman of the Board of Numedeon Inc., creator of the Whyville.net educational virtual world. In 2025, he was awarded the Casella Prize for Physiology by the Almo Collegio Borromeo in Pavia, Italy.

== Education ==
He graduated from McQuaid Jesuit High School in Rochester, New York attending Antioch College and Montana State University as an undergraduate and then received his PhD in neurophysiology from the University of Wisconsin–Madison, U.S. in 1982.

== Career and research ==
From 1984 until 2001, he was a professor at the California Institute of Technology and from 2001 until 2013 he was a professor at the University of Texas Health Science Center at San Antonio. At present he is an affiliate professor of biology at Southern Oregon University.

His research focuses on computational approaches to understanding structure; function relationships in mammalian cortical structures, particularly within the olfactory system and cerebellum. His laboratory employs both experimental and model-based methods and has contributed to the development of realistic modeling techniques in computational neuroscience.

== Scientific infrastructure ==
He has contributed to scientific infrastructure through efforts such as developing and maintaining the GENESIS simulation platform. He co-founded the Conference on Neural Information Processing Systems (NIPS) in 1987 and co-founded the Methods in Computational Neuroscience Course at the Marine Biological Laboratory in Woods Hole, which he directed with Christof Koch for its first five years. He also helped establish similar training programs in the European Union and Latin America, including the LASCON course. Additionally, he was a founding editor of the Journal of Computational Neuroscience and helped launch the Annual International Meeting in Computational Neuroscience, which he directed from 1991 to 2001 and again in 2010.

== Efforts in education ==
At Caltech, Bower founded and co-directed with his Caltech colleague Jerry Pine, Project SEED and then the Caltech Precollege Science Initiative (CAPSI). He has been a member of the National Research Council of the National Academy of Sciences, the National Science Foundation and the Society for Neuroscience. He is an innovator in online game-based learning and education as one of the founders of Whyville.net, an online simulation. He serves on the Board of Scientific Advisors at the Western Institute for Advanced Study.

== Business efforts ==
Bower is CEO and chairman of the board of Numedeon Inc., a company he founded in 1998 to develop virtual worlds with educational applications. The company created Whyville.net, an online platform launched in the early 2000s that had over 7 million registered users by 2006. The site has been noted for its engagement with young teens and its use of game-based learning strategies.

In 2015, Bower founded Virtual Worlds IP Inc. and serves as its CEO.

== Publications ==
- The Book of GENESIS: Exploring Realistic Neural Models with the GEneral NEural SImulation System, Springer Verlag, (1998), ISBN 978-0-387-94938-3
- Computational Modeling of Genetic and Biochemical Networks, MIT Press, (2004), ISBN 978-0-262-52423-0
- "Rethinking the Lesser Brain", Scientific American, August 2003.
- 20 Years of Computational Neuroscience, Springer, (2013), ISBN 978-1461414230
