= Numedeon =

Technology company based in Pasadena, California, USA

Numedeon, Inc. is a privately held company based in Pasadena, California, that since 1999 has been developing immersive online digital learning technology. Best known for creating the children's educational web site "Whyville", Numedeon has also developed a number of other immersive online learning environments for other demographics and purposes. Numedeon was founded by Dr. James M. Bower and several of his students and colleagues at the California Institute of Technology.

== "N.I.C.E." The Numedeon Interactive Community Engine ==
Numedeon's immersive virtual worlds are based on a proprietary online platform developed since 1999 through operation of its immersive learning environments. Core component of this engine are protected by U.S. Patents. N.I.C.E. "runs on a standard web browser, and can be run on a 56K modem".

== Whyville ==
Whyville was launched in 1999 as an educational Internet site geared towards children aged 8–14 to engage its users in learning about a broad range of topics, including science, business, art and geography. Whyville has a registered user base of over 7 million. Its users ("Whyvillians") engage in virtual world simulation-based games and role play sponsored by a wide range of governmental, non-profit and corporate entities.

Educational research based on Whyville has been published in the 2013 publication of the book Connected Play: Tweens in a Virtual World, written by Yasmin B. Kafai, Deborah A. Fields, and Mizuko Ito.

== Other immersive learning worlds ==
In addition to Whyville, Numedeon has used its NICE engine to build a number of other virtual immersive learning worlds, including, for example, Humanaville, a virtual world for seniors.

== Virtual Worlds IP ==
In January 2015, Numedeon established Virtual Worlds IP Inc as a subsidiary company specifically to manage Numedeon's accumulated intellectual property and to form joint ventures with Numedeon's partners to launch new products based on Numedeon's technology.

In September 2015, Virtual Worlds IP announced its first joint venture Fundamental Learning LLC as a partnership with Education Development Center in Waltham, Massachusetts.
