= OpenLife Grid =

- Developer: 3DX (山帝斯有限公司)
- Engine: Proprietary (3DXServer), GPL(Viewer), open source software Physics: ODE
- Platforms: Microsoft Windows: Windows XP SP2 and SP3; Windows Vista; Windows 7; Mac OS X (10.4.11 or higher) Linux i686
- Release: Sept 27, 2007

The OpenLife Grid was a community virtual world developed by 3DX. It was founded in November 2007 by Australian Steve Sima, president of 3DX. The OpenLife grid functionality was similar to that of Second Life, also using the WindLight graphics system.

More than 50,000 accounts were created. In early 2012, OpenLife changed its name to 3DMee and went offline for a rebuild, but the rebuild suffered from operating problems, and 3DMee reportedly closed in November 2013.

== See also ==
- Second Life
