= Koinup =

- Website type: Image and video hosting service
- Available in: English
- Owner: Koinup Srl (subsidiary of ExitReality)
- Website: Koinup.com
- Commercial: Yes
- Registration: Optional (required for uploading files)
- Launched: 2007
- Current status: Inactive

Koinup was an image and video hosting service, web portal and online community for virtual world users. It was used both as a photo and video repository platform and as a tool to share virtual world screenshots, photographs and machinima. As of November 2008, it claimed to host more than 100,000 items uploaded by its members and reaches about 100,000 visitors monthly.\ It was acquired in 2013 by Exitreality.

Centered on the concept of “Share your Virtual Life", Koinup offered a social networking platform for all virtual world inhabitants.

== History ==
Koinup was developed by Koinup Srl, a Brescia, Italy-based company founded in March 2007. The service was launched in September 2007, preceded by a four-month beta period. Initially, the two founders Pierluigi Casolari and Edoardo Turelli served respectively as chief executive officer and chief technical officer. Along with competitors such as gamerDNA, Koinup followed a trend in the social network scenery at that time by building a social network for online games.

According to the blog of the former company, on January 8, 2013, Koinup was acquired by ExitReality.

== Features ==
Koinup was a free service, allowing members to upload up to 1.5 gigabytes of photo and video content. As of 2008, Koinup did not offer a paid premium plan. Uploaders could add tags to their entries and create photo or video galleries. Uploaded content could be shared either by embedding web widgets on websites, or by using a set of social media sharing tools.

Koinup also featured tools aimed at creating a bridge between virtual worlds and the website. These tools allowed users to interact with their Koinup account while they are in virtual worlds. Particularly, members could send postcards directly from the clients to their Koinup galleries without leaving the virtual worlds.

One of the most popular features on the website was the Koinup Places Section. Koinup Places allowed users to geotag virtual world locations and upload them on Koinup. This feature created a user-generated directory of the best places hosted in virtual worlds. According to a publication in 2008, more than 1,000 virtual places have already been suggested by the Koinup community.

On April 22, 2010, Koinup expanded their service by launching a paid application on the Nokia Store featuring wallpapers of virtual world related image content. With the launch of Metaverse Wallpapers on March 11, 2011, on Apple's App Store, a similar application became available for iOS devices.

== Interoperability ==
One of the main challenges faced by Koinup was the issue of interoperability between virtual worlds.

In 2007, the virtual world scene was made up of numerous standalone walled gardens that did not communicate with each other. Even as of this writing in 2023, the virtual world scene is made up of numerous standalone walled gardens that only minimally communicate with each other. Only since 2022 were there standardized tools for moving and sharing the avatar identity from one world to another or ways to interact with multiple virtual worlds from a single dashboard. In response to this problem, one of Koinup's goals was to allow users to manage both the content and the friends they have in various virtual worlds with a single account.
