= Transformed social interaction =

Transformed social interaction (TSI) is a research paradigm and theoretical framework related to social interaction in virtual environments.

== Overview ==
Virtual reality allows one to break normal rules of physical interaction because users do not actually have to share the same "reality". For example, in a collaborative virtual environment (CVE), a presenter can program their digital avatar to maintain eye contact with every person in the audience at the same time. Because each member of the audience has their own view of the world, they would each think that the presenter was indeed looking at them all the time even though there are in fact many different versions of "reality" co-occurring at the same time. Three categories of TSI have been identified.

=== Self-representation TSIs ===
Dramatic and subtle changes to appearances or behaviors can be made to our avatars for social advantage. For example, a digital avatar could incorporate 20% or 40% of someone else's face. Studies have shown that both behavioral and visual mimicry can make a person more persuasive.

Changes in digital self-representation can also be used to modify a person's own attitudes and behaviors. For example, users in tall avatars became more aggressive in a negotiation task than users in short avatars. And users placed in avatars of an elderly person held fewer negative stereotypes of the elderly in general.

=== Social sensory abilities ===
A virtual environment can provide information to a person that would be considered super-human powers in real life. For example, virtual classrooms could enable teachers to monitor students' understanding by tracking their eye gaze patterns and other gestures. Or it could alert teachers when they have not maintained eye contact with certain students in the virtual classroom for a long period of time.

=== Environmental transformations ===
Because every user sees their own version of the virtual space, different users could be in different or exactly the same spatial setting. For example, in a virtual classroom, every student could be sitting right in front of the teacher. And because a digital environment can store information, students could also "rewind" to hear part of the material again.

An example of digital morphing of faces. In the top row, 40% of Bush's facial features are morphed into another man's face. In the bottom row, 40% of Kerry's facial features are morphed into a woman's face.

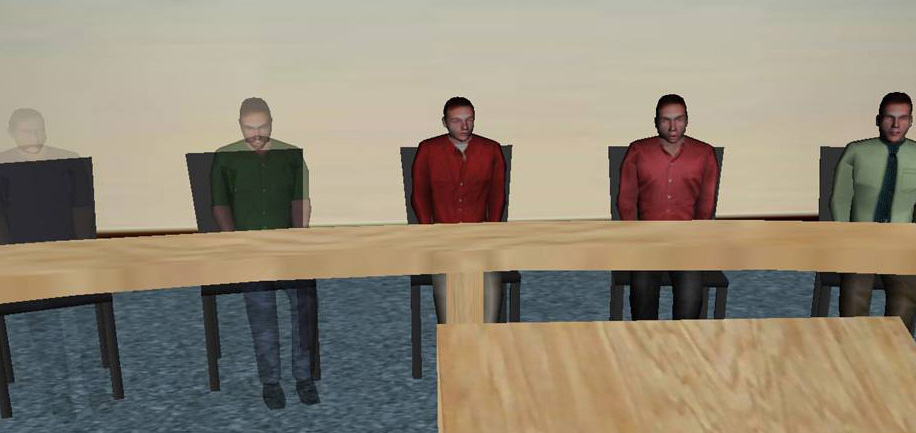
Teachers in virtual classrooms could gain "super-powers". For example, visual cues could help them spread their gaze among all students equally. Students who have not received gaze attention from the teacher could start to literally fade away to alert the teacher.
