= Viverse =

Virtual reality platform

- Headquarters: Dublin, Ireland
- Country of origin: Taiwan
- Founder: Cher Wang
- Industry: Virtual reality, augmented reality, software, technology, content
- Services: Vive World, Market, Vive Avatar, Vive Wallet, Vive Guardian, Viverse For Business, VRChat, Vive Sync
- Parent: HTC
- Website: www.viverse.com
- Launched: 1 March 2022; 4 years ago

Viverse is an open platform for virtual worlds and environments developed by HTC and encompassing multiple devices and applications. At launch, HTC described the platform as a metaverse intended to connect a series of virtual worlds, and to include elements of augmented reality. The Viverse platform consists of various components, including virtual reality headsets, social applications, and content creation tools.

== History and development ==
Some elements that later became part of the Viverse ecosystem were developed as early as 2014. The formal announcement of Viverse only came in 2022 at the 2022 Mobile World Congress in Barcelona. Viverse was co-founded by Cher Wang, the CEO of HTC, who is also the Chairwoman of Viverse.

While some HTC hardware has important implications for Viverse, Viverse is envisioned as an open metaverse, and so is not confined to any HTC hardware.

== Components and partners ==
As of 2023, Viverse consists of a number of virtual environments, services, platforms, interfaces, and applications, including:

- Vive Avatar - A tool for generating and storing custom avatars which represent user Viverse personas.
- Vive Wallet - A cryptocurrency and NFT wallet which also manages user digital identity. The wallet supports Ethereum and Polygon.
- Market - A platform for buying and selling NFTs.
- Vive World - User-designed virtual environments that act as a home space for users.
- Vive Sync - A virtual meeting and conference platform in VR.
- Viveport - A subscription-based content library of virtual reality games and apps.
- Vive Guardian - An application focused on the security and privacy of children.
- Viverse for Business - Viverse for business includes tools for companies to create custom, branded virtual spaces, either as workspaces or for interacting with customers such as virtual common spaces, reception, showrooms, classrooms, meeting spaces, and auditoriums. HTC plans to provide support for these spaces on multiple platforms, including VR headsets, smartphones, tablets, and PCs.

=== Partners ===
A number of virtual environments created by 3rd party developers are integrated into Viverse:

- ENGAGE - A social VR platform designed to enable enterprise, education, and creative entities to have a metaverse presence.
- Beatday - A virtual music platform with social elements.
- VRChat - A virtual reality social platform.
- Museum of Other Realities - A collection of virtual art.

== Reception ==
When HTC released a promotional video for the platform in February 2022, Scott Hayden of Road to VR wrote in an opinion piece that it was "a treacly sweet dollar store knock-off of Meta's hype video" that was "more concerned with lining up the right buzzwords than offering an honest-to-goodness vision of the future". He noted that, according to a browser extension, the video had drawn about three dislikes for every like, which he said was unusual for the company's videos, and called HTC's NFT marketplace "more flash than boom".

Reporting on the launch of Viverse Worlds in February 2025, Hayden wrote that services of this kind are difficult to monetize and that comparable platforms aim at niches rather than at broad adoption, adding that "it's not an easy space to compete in" and that "HTC isn't the company it once was".

In December 2025 HTC said the platform had reached one million monthly active users. Ben Lang of Road to VR noted that Viverse runs on flatscreen devices as well as headsets, that it was unclear what share of users arrived through a headset, and that few of the platform's most popular experiences were marked as compatible with VR.

== See also ==
- Avatar (computing)
- Massively multiplayer online role-playing game
- Multiverse (video games)
- Virtual reality
- Virtual world
