= Nick Yee =

American media scholar

- Born: Hong Kong
- Education: Stanford University
- Organization: Quantic Foundry
- Website: www.nickyee.com

Nick Yee is an American researcher who studies self-representation and social interaction in virtual environments.

== Biography ==
Yee earned his bachelor's degree in psychology from Haverford College (with a concentration in computer science) and received his Ph.D. in communication from Stanford University in 2007. He was a researcher at the Palo Alto Research Center in California from 2005 to 2012.

The Daedalus Project, his research into the psychology and sociology of MMORPGs, has collected survey data from over 40,000 game players. The research that has resulted from these interviews has been cited extensively by game scholars, game developers, and popular media. Yee's research has appeared in The New York Times, The Wall Street Journal, BusinessWeek, and CNN International, among other media outlets. Snippets of an interview with Yee on the topic of online gaming can be seen in the documentary Second Skin, which premiered at the 2008 SXSW Arts festival.

On March 8, 2009, Yee announced the hibernation of the Daedalus project, saying "... I think I came to realize that continuing the project would require more time than I could devote to it..."

In 2015, Yee co-founded Quantic Foundry with Nicolas Ducheneaut.

== Bibliography ==
- The Proteus Paradox: How Online Games and Virtual Worlds Change Us-And How They Don't (2014)
