= Ravi Iyengar =

Biochemist and systems biologist at Icahn School of Medicine at Mount Sinai

- Born: June 16, 1951 (age 75)
- Citizenship: United States
- Education: University of Mumbai; University of Houston
- Known for: Modeling of signaling networks; Network-based approaches to drug action and adverse events
- Scientific career
- Fields: Biochemistry; Systems biology; Cell signaling; Systems pharmacology
- Workplaces: Icahn School of Medicine at Mount Sinai
- Thesis: Biochemical studies on the possible mechanism of vasopressin action on canine renal medulla (1977)

Ravi Iyengar is a biochemist and systems biologist and pharmacologist and professor at the Icahn School of Medicine at Mount Sinai in New York City. He directs the Mount Sinai Institute for Systems Biomedicine and lead the Systems Biology Center of New York, a transdisciplinary research center supported by the National Institute of General Medical Sciences.

Iyengar is known for integrating experimental biochemistry with computational modeling to study how cells process information through cell-signaling networks. His research has described emergent properties of signaling pathways and how network structure can produce complex behavior in mammalian cells. He holds four patents and edited six books.

== Education and career ==
=== Education ===
Iyengar completed undergraduate and master's degrees at the University of Mumbai and earned graduate degrees at the University of Houston, followed by postdoctoral training at Baylor College of Medicine.

=== Professional ===
At Mount Sinai, he served as chair of the Department of Pharmacology (later Pharmacology and Biological Chemistry) and as of 2026 holds the Dorothy H. and Lewis Rosenstiel Professorship. He also served as dean of research of the medical school in the early 2000s. He has also served as Director of the Experimental Therapeutics Institute (ETI) at Mount Sinai. In 2009, he led a multi–principal investigator project funded through the NIH Transformative Research Projects (T-R01) program focused on assembling functional human kidney tissue in vitro using computational modeling and nanofabrication. A member of the Mount Sinai faculty since 1986.

Iyengar is a Fellow of the American Association for the Advancement of Science (AAAS).

=== Teaching and online education ===
Iyengar has published teaching resources on graduate education in cell signaling and quantitative modeling in Science and in Science Signaling (formerly Science STKE), including course materials and approaches for using journal clubs and online asynchronous discussion as an assessment tool. He also co-authored a Science article describing an inquiry-learning format that integrated expert lectures, journal clubs, and web-based discussion forums to support critical reasoning and peer-review skills in graduate training.

In 2012, Mount Sinai announced an agreement with Coursera to offer graduate and medical school coursework online beginning in 2013, and identified Iyengar as leading the initiative.

== Research ==
Iyengar's laboratory combines experimental measurements with computational and mathematical modeling to study signaling network topology, regulatory motifs (e.g., feedback and feedforward loops), and spatial organization of signaling processes in cells and tissues. Through the Systems Biology Center of New York, he has helped develop and disseminate systems approaches to pathophysiological processes, drug action, and adverse event prediction, linking network methods to precision medicine applications.

His work has also been associated with the development of systems pharmacology approaches for understanding adverse events and drug effects at the network level.

Iyengar's research focuses on how cells process information through interconnected cell-signaling networks, combining biochemical experiments with computational modeling. He and colleagues described how different adenylyl cyclase isoforms have distinct functional properties and tissue distributions, allowing cells to tailor the integrative properties of cAMP signaling by varying isoform expression. Iyengar discussed showed an expanded role for cAMP as a "gating" mechanism between signaling pathways. He later co-authored work reporting that cAMP-dependent regulation of protein phosphatase 1 can gate CaMKII signaling during long-term potentiation in hippocampal neurons.

Iyengar has also published modeling work on emergent behaviors in signaling networks, including feedback-driven bistability and threshold responses. He co-authored a graph-theoretic analysis of a mammalian signaling network model of hippocampal CA1 neurons that identified recurring regulatory motifs such as feedback and feedforward loops.

In the 2020s, Iyengar has been a co-author on Kidney Precision Medicine Project consortium studies developing single-cell and spatial reference atlases of human kidney tissue, including a reference tissue atlas and an integrated multimodal atlas of healthy and injured cell states and tissue "niches."

=== Patents ===
- US Patent 6,555,522 – Peptides and small molecules derived from regions of interacting proteins and uses thereof. (granted April 2003).
- US Patent 6,034,071 – Mutant activated Gs alpha and adenylyl cyclase 2 for use as therapeutic agents. (granted March 2000).
- US Patent 8,808,992 SHOC2 mutations causing Noonan-like syndrome with loose anagen hair. (granted August 19, 2014).
- US Patent 8,271,414 Network characterization, feature extraction and application to classification. (granted September 18, 2012).

== Awards and honors ==
- 2018 – Jacobi Medallion (Mount Sinai Health System).
- 2005 – Innovations Award (IME Excellence in Teaching Awards).
- 2004 – Elected Fellow of the American Association for the Advancement of Science (AAAS).
- 1980–1983 – Established Investigator, American Heart Association
- 1980 – NIH New Investigator Award.
- American Heart Association Established Investigator Award.

== Publications ==
=== Editorial ===
Iyengar served as editor-in-chief of IET Systems Biology (2007–2009) and editor of the journal Systems Biology. He is also editor of the journal Systems Biology.

=== Books and chapters ===
- G Proteins (Academic Press, 1990). Edited by Ravi Iyengar and Lutz Birnbaumer. ISBN 978-0-12-377450-7.
- Heterotrimeric G Proteins (Methods in Enzymology, vol. 237; Academic Press, 1994). Edited by Ravi Iyengar. ISBN 978-0-12-182138-8.
- Heterotrimeric G-Protein Effectors (Methods in Enzymology, vol. 238; Academic Press, 1994). Edited by Ravi Iyengar. ISBN 978-0-12-182139-5.
- G Protein Pathways, Part A: Receptors (Methods in Enzymology, vol. 343; Academic Press, 2001). Edited by Ravi Iyengar and John D. Hildebrandt. ISBN 978-0-12-182244-6.
- G Protein Pathways, Part B: G Proteins and Their Regulators (Methods in Enzymology, vol. 344; Academic Press, 2001). Edited by Ravi Iyengar and John D. Hildebrandt. ISBN 978-0-12-182245-3.
- G Protein Pathways, Part C: Effector Mechanisms (Methods in Enzymology, vol. 345; Academic Press, 2001). Edited by Ravi Iyengar and John D. Hildebrandt. ISBN 978-0-12-182246-0.

=== Articles ===
Partial list:

- Bhalla, U. S.; Iyengar, R. (1999). "Emergent properties of networks of biological signaling pathways." Science. 283 (5400): 381–387. doi:10.1126/science.283.5400.381.
- Jordan, J. D.; Landau, E. M.; Iyengar, R. (2000). "Signaling networks: The origins of cellular multitasking." Cell. 103 (2): 193–200. doi:10.1016/S0092-8674(00)00112-4.
- Berger, S. I.; Iyengar, R. (2009). "Network analyses in systems pharmacology." Bioinformatics. 25 (19): 2466–2472. doi:10.1093/bioinformatics/btp465.
- Berger, S. I.; Iyengar, R. (2011). "Role of systems pharmacology in understanding drug adverse events." Wiley Interdisciplinary Reviews: Systems Biology and Medicine. 3 (2): 129–135. doi:10.1002/wsbm.114.
