= Digital conversation =

A digital conversation is a scripted dialogue between a person and a computer through various digital mediums, including web browsers, PDAs, mobile phones, and interactive television.

== Introduction ==
An example of a digital conversation being run on a mobile device

Digital conversations are scripted by humans, uploaded to a server where they can be accessed as a web service by other humans (consumers, employees, etc.) and used to impart information to them.

A digital conversation can be undertaken simultaneously from multiple digital channels, with any changes made to a digital conversation reflected across all channels immediately.

Digital conversations are designed to engage consumers in a conversation where the goal is to find out what they want and guide them towards achieving it. This has been used for advertising purposes, and can be beneficial for companies.

The past two years have witnessed the first examples of true two-way marketing conversations between customers and some of the world’s leading consumer brands. Driven by a confluence of innovation, competition and big shifts in consumer behaviour, the dialogue between brands and their customers is replacing the traditional marketing monologue

— The Future of Marketing: From Monologue to Dialogue, The Economist, September 2006

I think things are going to get infinitely more complex and the challenge is about taking things that are infinitely more complex and making them simpler and more understandable.

— Robert M. Greenberg, Head of R/GA

In the same New York Times article, Robert M. Greenberg then states that he wants to "engage (consumers) in digital conversations that are so entertaining, involving and valuable that they won't want to ignore them." Digital conversations are created to be, in essence, human interactions and dialogue with one human removed. Unlike Bots and Avatars, digital conversations are scripted, leading to more human-like interactions.

== Bio-systems ==
Digital conversations consist of a four-stage "bio-system":

1. Create: Consisting of the preliminary creation and refining of the digital conversation including its front end;
2. Interact: Whereby consumers engage with the digital conversation;
3. Understand: The usage data of every consumer engaged in Wina Conversation is automatically stored and aggregated and can be viewed quickly and easily;
4. Adapt: This usage data may lead to changes to the digital conversation which are reflected in real time across all channels (as the Conversation is called from one source no matter what the medium accessing it).

=== Creation: Scripting a digital conversation ===
A standard scripting canvas for a digital conversation, each symbol represents a question, note, link or outcome

Each digital conversation is made up of a dialogue-based script consisting of a narrative and choices with pathways that lead to different outcomes. It is the user, through their choices, who decides which pathway to follow. The script takes the form of a decision tree and is the backbone of the digital conversation. Each Decision-Tree defines two or more Pathways. The endpoint of a Pathway is an Outcome or a loosely coupled Link to another digital conversation enabling longer digital conversation flows.

By embracing the concepts of Web 2.0 and allowing infinite numbers of digital conversations to be linked, tan allows complex subjects to be tackled. One digital conversation written by an expert in Europe can be linked to an existing digital conversation written by an expert in Africa. This allows in theory, vast knowledge landscapes made up of components.

A digital conversation can contain good dialogue or bad dialogue. Good dialogue typically means the aggregated interaction of each Dialogue-Step is undertaken in less than five seconds. This means a person can read and understand a Dialogue Step after one read-through and wants to continue to the next Dialogue Step.

Bad dialogue has the opposite effect. Unclear language, for example, can cause confusion and have an adverse effect on a user, the worst-case scenario is when a user leaves a digital conversation in despair. Thanks to the available Metrics, such problems can be spotted quickly (numerous users exiting on one particular step indicates an issue with that step) and acted upon, with the dialogue changed as and when needed.

So, the development of a good digital conversation which will engage users requires a combination of skills in particular:

- Two-way communication
- Decision tree logic
- Behavioural economics

A digital conversation can be created for any scripted dialogue. Thus, it is suited for marketing, sales, support, practices, guides, policies, procedures, and much more.

=== Interaction ===
Digital conversations can be accessed and thus engaged with in numerous ways, whether by browser (see image to the left), mobile phone (see image above) or even voice.

Due to the Web Service nature of digital conversations, the front ends designed to access them can be extremely diverse (see Links section for several examples) and thus can reflect branding needs or the needs of the user (for example large fonts for partially sighted users).

One of the recent developments has been the use of digital conversations to drive Avatars.

==== Web 4.0 Avatar ====
One of the trends of recent years has been the humanizing of digital channels, giving a face to things which are not human. This has led to the creation of avatars (also known as bots or chatter-bots) artificial intelligences with which users can “converse”. The success of such bots varies greatly. There are a few who respond in a convincingly human way. They are commonly referred to as “Bots” as their conversations often result in a stilted, mechanical interaction where straying off a recognized path can lead to poor responses. However, this has not stopped their spread across the commercial world, with several high-profile companies adopting them as part of their customer services. Avatars such as IKEA's Anna have generated interest both in the business community and among the public.

Web 2.0 Avatars, powered by digital conversations, provide a level of immersion not found in these bots, because digital conversations are scripted, just like a book or film. They are designed to guide a user, through high quality dialogue and interactions, to an outcome. Along with this, the ability to understand user interactions through Decision Metrics means that these Web 2.0 Avatars can be adapted to emergent demands as they appear. The dialogue can be improved and built up as and when needed.

=== Understanding: Measurement and metrics ===
The automated recording of a digital conversation establishes the analytical science of interaction at scale. As a person interacts with a digital conversation service, each Dialogue Step is recorded verbatim with a date and time step. Anonymous recording of consumers' usage provides aggregated emergent patterns without infringing data privacy.

This measurement, providing the aggregated performance of each Dialogue-Step, Pathway and Outcome provides the scientific basis for Demand-Sensing allowing behavioural data to become quantifiable.

=== Adaptation: Evolving Dialogue ===
Once the usage data has been viewed and understood, it may well be necessary to react by changing or amending the digital conversation.
