= Avatar (computing) =

Graphical representation of a user or a user's alter ego or character

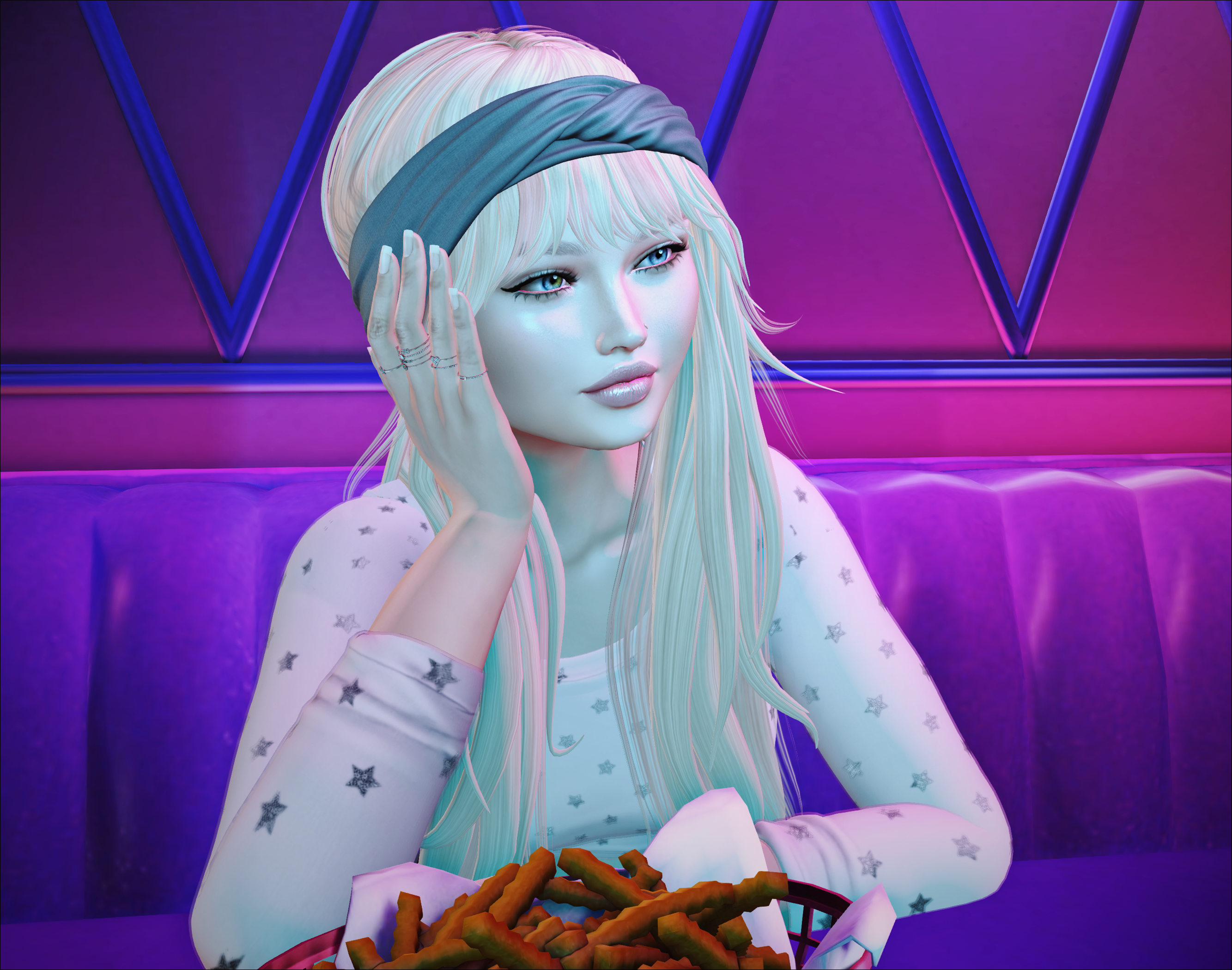
An avatar in the virtual world Second Life

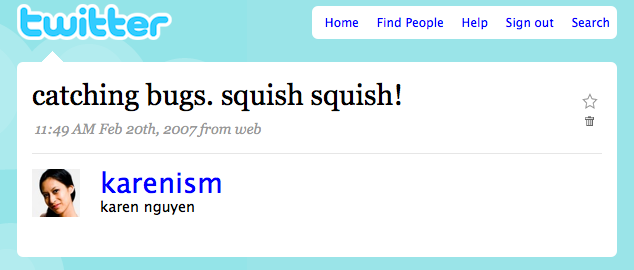
A Twitter post, with the user's profile picture

In computing, an avatar is a graphical representation of a user, the user's character, or persona. Avatars can be two-dimensional icons in Internet forums and other online communities, where they are also known as profile pictures (pfps), userpics, or formerly picons (personal icons, or possibly "picture icons"). Alternatively, an avatar can take the form of a three-dimensional model, as used in online worlds and video games, or an imaginary character with no graphical appearance, as in text-based games or worlds such as MUDs.

The term (/ˈævətɑːr, ˌævəˈtɑːr/) originates from Sanskrit avatāra, and was adopted by early computer games and science fiction novelists. Richard Garriott extended the term to an on-screen user representation in 1985, and the term gained wider adoption in Internet forums and Multi-user dungeons. Nowadays, avatars are used in a variety of online settings including social media, virtual assistants, instant messaging platforms, and digital worlds such as World of Warcraft and Second Life. They can take the form of an image of one's real-life self, as often seen on platforms like Facebook and LinkedIn, or a virtual character that diverges from the real world. Often, these are customised to show support for different causes, or to create a unique online representation.

Academic research has focused on how avatars can influence the outcomes of communication and digital identity. Users can employ avatars with fictional characteristics to gain social acceptance or ease social interaction. However, studies have found that the majority of users choose avatars that resemble their real-world selves.

== Origins ==
The word avatar is ultimately derived from the Sanskrit word (avatāra /ˈævətɑːr, ˌævəˈtɑːr/); in Hinduism, it stands for the "descent" of a deity into a terrestrial form. It was first used in a computer game by the 1979 PLATO role-playing game Avatar. In Norman Spinrad's novel Songs from the Stars (1980), the term avatar is used in a description of a computer-generated virtual experience. In the story, humans receive messages from an alien galactic network that wishes to share knowledge and experience with other advanced civilizations through "songs". The humans build a "galactic receiver" that allows its users to engage in "artificial realities". One experience is described thus:

You stand in a throng of multifleshed being, mind avatared in all its matter, on a broad avenue winding through a city of blue trees with bright red foliage and living buildings growing from the soil in a multitude of forms.

The use of the term avatar for the on-screen representation of the user was coined in 1985 by Richard Garriott for the computer game Ultima IV: Quest of the Avatar. In this game, Garriott desired the player's character to be their Earth self manifested into the virtual world. Due to the ethical content of his story, Garriott wanted the real player to be responsible for their character; he thought only someone playing "themselves" could be properly judged based on their in-game actions. Because of its ethically nuanced narrative approach, he took the Hindu word associated with a deity's manifestation on earth in physical form, and applied it to a player in the game world. Other early uses of the term include Lucasfilm and Chip Morningstar's 1986 online role-playing game Habitat, and the 1989 pen and paper role-playing game Shadowrun.

The use of avatar to mean online virtual bodies was popularised by Neal Stephenson in his 1992 cyberpunk novel Snow Crash. In Snow Crash, the term avatar was used to describe the virtual simulation of the human form in the Metaverse, a fictional virtual-reality application on the Internet. Social status within the Metaverse was often based on the quality of a user's avatar, as a highly detailed avatar showed that the user was a skilled hacker and programmer while the less talented would buy off-the-shelf models in the same manner a beginner would today. Stephenson wrote in the "Acknowledgments" to Snow Crash:

The idea of a "virtual reality" such as the Metaverse is by now widespread in the computer-graphics community and is being used in a number of different ways. The particular vision of the Metaverse as expressed in this novel originated from idle discussion between me and Jaime (Captain Bandwidth) Taaffe ... The words avatar (in the sense used here) and Metaverse are my inventions, which I came up with when I decided that existing words (such as virtual reality) were simply too awkward to use ... after the first publication of Snow Crash, I learned that the term avatar has actually been in use for a number of years as part of a virtual reality system called Habitat...in addition to avatars, Habitat includes many of the basic features of the Metaverse as described in this book.

== Types and usage ==
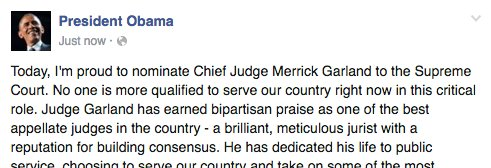
2016 Facebook post from Barack Obama, with his photo next to his name at the top of the post

An avatar can be a two-dimensional picture akin to an icon in online communities. This is also known as a profile picture or userpic, or in early Internet parlance, a 'picon' (personal icon). With the advent of social media platforms like Facebook, where users are not typically anonymous, these pictures often are a photo of the user in real life.

Alternatively, avatars can also be three-dimensional digital representations, as in games such as World of Warcraft or virtual worlds like Second Life. In MUDs and other early systems, they were a construct composed of text. The term has been also sometimes extended to the personality connected with the screen name, or handle, of an Internet user.

=== Internet forums ===
Despite the widespread use of avatars, it is unknown which Internet forums were the first to use them; the earliest forums did not include avatars as a default feature, and they were included in unofficial "hacks" before eventually being made standard. Avatars on Internet forums serve the purpose of representing users and their actions, personalizing their contributions to the forum, and may represent different parts of their persona, beliefs, interests or social status in the forum.

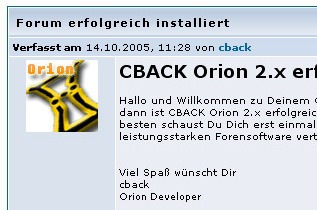
Example of an avatar image on an internet forum

The traditional avatar system used on most Internet forums is a small (80x80 to 100x100 pixels, for example) square-shaped area close to the user's forum post, where the avatar is placed in order for other users to easily identify who has written the post without having to read their username. Some forums allow the user to upload an avatar image that may have been designed by the user or acquired from elsewhere. Other forums allow the user to select an avatar from a preset list or use an auto-discovery algorithm to extract one from the user's homepage.

Some avatars are animated, consisting of a sequence of multiple images played repeatedly. In such animated avatars, the number of images as well as the time in which they are replayed vary considerably.

Other avatar systems exist, such as on Gaia Online, WeeWorld, Frenzoo or Meez, where a pixelized representation of a person or creature is used, which can then be customized to the user's wishes. There are also avatar systems (e.g. Trutoon) where a representation is created using a person's face with customized characters and backgrounds.

Another avatar-based system is one wherein an image is automatically generated based on the identity of the poster. Identicons are formed as visually distinct geometric images derived from a digest hash of the poster's IP address or user ID. These serve as a means to associate a particular user with a particular geometric representation. When used with an IP address, a particular anonymous user can be visually identified without the need for registration or authentication. If an account is compromised, a dissimilar identicon will be formed as the attacker is posting from an unfamiliar IP address.

=== Internet chat and messaging ===
GIF avatars were introduced as early as 1990 in the ImagiNation Network (also known as Sierra On-Line) game and chat hybrid. In 1994, Virtual Places offered VOIP capabilities which were later abandoned for lack of bandwidth. In 1996 Microsoft Comic Chat, an IRC client that used cartoon avatars for chatting, was released.

America Online introduced instant messaging for its membership in 1996 and included a limited number of "buddy icons," picking up on the avatar idea from PC games. When AOL later introduced the free version of its messenger, AIM, for use by anyone on the Internet, the number of icons offered grew to be more than 1,000 and the use of them grew exponentially, becoming a hallmark feature of instant messaging. In 2002, AOL introduced "Super Buddies," 3D animated icons that talked to users as they typed messages and read messages. The term Avatar began to replace the moniker of "buddy icon" as 3D customizable icons became known to its users from the mainstream popularity of PC Games. Yahoo's instant messenger was the first to adopt the term "avatar" for its icons. Instant messaging avatars were usually very small; AIM icons have been as small as 16×16 pixels but are used more commonly at the 48×48 pixel size, although many icons can be found online that typically measure anywhere from 50×50 pixels to 100×100 pixels in size.

More recently, services such as Discord have added avatars. With a paid subscription, users can select individual identities for different communities.

=== Online assistants ===
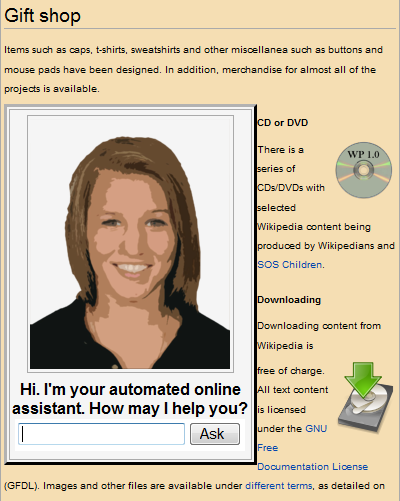
An avatar used by an automated online assistant providing customer service on a web page

Avatars can be used as virtual embodiments of embodied agents, which are driven more or less by artificial intelligence rather than real people. Automated online assistants are examples of avatars used in this way.

Such avatars are used by organizations as a part of automated customer services in order to interact with consumers and users of services. This can avail for enterprises to reduce their operating and training cost. A major underlying technology to such systems is natural language processing. Some of these avatars are commonly known as "bots". Famous examples include IKEA's Anna, an avatar designed to guide users around the IKEA website.

Such avatars can also be powered by a digital conversation which provides a little more structure than those using NLP, offering the user options and clearly defined paths to an outcome. This kind of avatar is known as a Structured Language Processing or SLP Avatar.

=== Video games ===
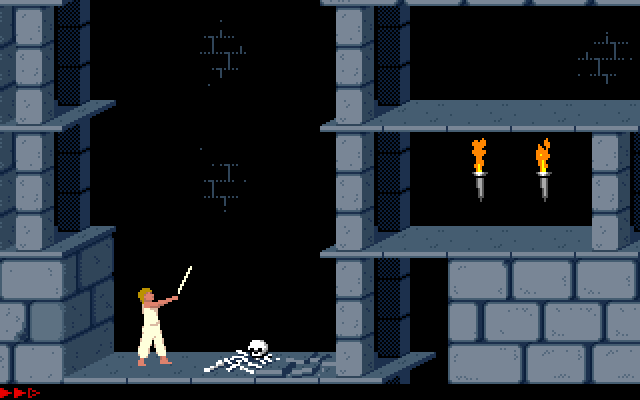
The player character picks up a sword in the 1989 video game Prince of Persia.

Avatars in video games are the player's representation in the game world. The first video games to include a representation of the player were Basketball (1974) which represented players as humans, and Maze War (1974) which represented players as eyeballs.

In some games, the player's representation is fixed, however many games offer a basic character model, or template, and then allow customization of the physical features as the player sees fit. For example, Carl Johnson, the avatar from Grand Theft Auto: San Andreas, can be dressed in a wide range of clothing, can be given tattoos and haircuts, and can even body build or become obese depending upon player actions. One video game in which the avatar and player are two separate entities is the game Perspective, where the player controls both themself in a 3-dimensional world and the avatar in a 2-dimensional world.

Aside from an avatar's physical appearance, its dialogue, particularly in cutscenes, may also reveal something of its character. A good example is the crude, action hero stereotype, Duke Nukem. Other avatars, such as Gordon Freeman from Half-Life, who never speaks at all, reveal very little of themselves (the original game never showed the player what he looked like without the use of a console command for third-person view).

Many Massively multiplayer online games (MMOGs) also include customizable avatars. Customization levels differ between games; for instance, in EVE Online, players construct a wholly customized portrait, using a software that allows for several changes to facial structure as well as preset hairstyles, skin tones, etc. However, these portraits appear only in in-game chats and static information view of other players. Usually, all players appear in gigantic spacecraft that give no view of their pilot, unlike in most other RPGs. Alternatively, City of Heroes offers one of the most detailed and comprehensive in-game avatar creation processes, allowing players to construct anything from traditional superheroes to aliens, medieval knights, monsters, robots, and many more. Robbie Cooper's 2007 book "Alter Ego, Avatars and their creators" pairs photographs of players of a variety of MMO's with images of their in-game avatars and profiles; recording the player's motivations and intentions in designing and using their avatars. The survey reveals wide variation in the ways in which players of MMO's use avatars. Felicia Day, creator and star of The Guild web series, created a song called "(Do You Wanna Date My) Avatar" which satirizes avatars and virtual dating.

Universal animated avatars from the Xbox avatar (shown left) and Mii (shown right)

Nintendo's Wii, 3DS and Switch consoles allow for the creation of avatars called "Miis" that take the form of stylized, cartoonish people and can be used in some games as avatars for players, as in Wii Sports. In some games, the ability to use a Mii as an avatar must be unlocked, such as in Mario Kart 8.

In late 2008, Microsoft released an Xbox 360 Dashboard update which featured the introduction of Xbox avatars as part of the console's New Xbox Experience. With the update installed users can personalize the look of their Avatars by choosing from a range of clothing and facial features. In October 2018, Microsoft launched a new version of their Xbox avatars for Xbox One and Xbox on Windows 10, featuring increased detail and having a focus on inclusivity. PlayStation Home for Sony's PlayStation 3 console also featured the use of avatars, but with a more realistic style than Nintendo's Miis or Microsoft's Xbox avatars.

=== Non-gaming online worlds ===
Avatars in non-gaming online worlds are used as two- or three-dimensional human or fantastic representations of a person's inworld self. Such representations are a tool which facilitates the exploration of the virtual universe, or acts as a focal point in conversations with other users, and can be customized by the user. Usually, the purpose and appeal of such universes is to provide a large enhancement to common online conversation capabilities, and to allow the user to peacefully develop a portion of a non-gaming universe without being forced to strive towards a pre-defined goal.

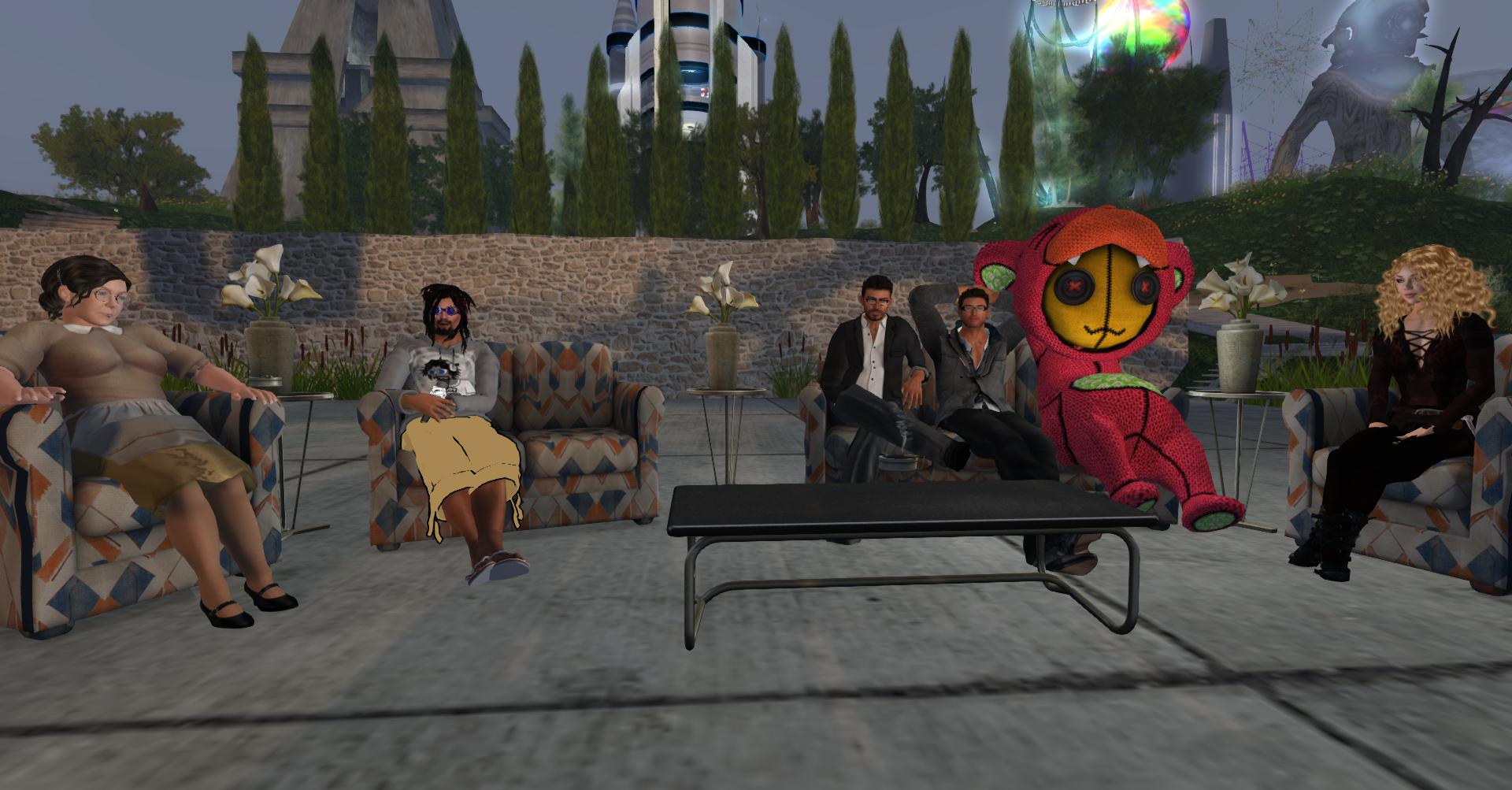
Avatars socialising in the 2003 virtual world Second Life

The earliest avatars of this form were text-based descriptions employed by players within MUDs. These often allowed players to express an identity disparate from their public one within an interactive environment. For instance, LambdaMOO allowed a choice of 11 different genders, which could be changed at the user's will. The visually-based game Habitat also used the term to refer to players within the game world. A later example is Linden Lab's Second Life, which has the player use a custom avatar to interact in a virtual 3D world; after peaking in 2007, its user count declined due to the encroachment of more traditional platforms such as Facebook. More recently, the concept has been combined with virtual reality; VRChat allows the user to interact with other avatars in custom environments, and Mark Zuckerberg's Meta Platforms has promoted it as part of his vision of a metaverse.

Many modern virtual worlds provide users with advanced tools to customize their representations, allowing them to change shapes, hair, skins and also genre. Moreover, there is a secondary industry devoted to the creations of products and items for the avatars. Some companies have also launched social networks and other websites for avatars such as Koinup, Myrl, and Avatars United.

Lisa Nakamura has suggested that customizable avatars in non-gaming worlds tend to be biased towards lighter skin colors and against darker skin colors, especially in those of the male gender. In Second Life avatars are created by residents and take any form, and range from lifelike humans to robots, animals, plants and legendary creatures. Avatar customization is one of the most important entertainment aspects in non gaming virtual worlds, such as Second Life, IMVU, and Active Worlds. Some evidence suggests that avatars that are more anthropomorphic are perceived to be less credible and likeable than images that are less anthropomorphic. Social scientists at Stanford's Virtual Human Interaction Lab examine the implications, possibilities, and transformed social interaction that occur when people interact via avatars.

=== Social media ===
Another use of the avatar has emerged with the widespread use of social media platforms. There is a practice in social media sites: uploading avatars in place of real profile image. Profile picture is a distinct graphics that represent the identity of profile holder. It is usually the portrait of an individual, logo of an organization, organizational building or distinctive character of book, cover page etc. Using avatars as profile pictures can increase users' perceived level of social presence which in turn fosters reciprocity and sharing behavior in online environments. According to MIT professor Sherry Turkle: "... we think we will be presenting ourselves, but our profile ends up as somebody else – often the fantasy of who we want to be".

=== Motion capture ===
Another form of use for avatars is for video chats/calls. Some services, such as Skype (through some external plugins) allow users to use talking avatars during video calls, replacing the image from the user's camera with an animated, talking avatar. Through the use of facial motion capture and a webcam, an avatar can be configured to mimic the motions and expressions of the user. This can be integrated directly into games, such as Star Citizen, and via standalone software such as FaceRig.

Both 3D and 2D avatars have been used in Learning and Development content for education, onboarding, employee training and more. Photorealistic 3D AI avatars have been used as stand-ins for real actors via video editing tools like those made by Synthesia among others.

Virtual YouTubers use animated avatars designed in software such as Live2D, which often resemble anime characters. A whole ecosystem of talent agencies and investors exists to manage these online personalities, which often differ from the creator's real-life persona. YouTube's 2020 Culture and Trends report highlighted VTubers as one of the notable trends of that year, with 1.5 billion views per month by October, and in May 2021, Twitch added a VTuber tag for streams as part of a wider expansion of its tag system.

=== After death ===
With the rise of artificial intelligence in the mid-2020s, companies began offering to create 3D avatars of individuals, particularly those near death.

=== Miscellaneous ===
Samsung's Galaxy Avatar/AR Emoji which comes on Samsung Galaxy smartphones lets users create animated avatars of themselves.

=== In popular culture ===
Cartoons and stories sometimes have a character based on their creator, either a fictionalised version (e.g. the Matt Groening character in some episodes of The Simpsons) or an entirely fictional character (e.g. Hermione Granger in the Harry Potter series has been said by J. K. Rowling to be based upon herself). Such characters are sometimes known as "author surrogates", "author avatars" or Self Inserts.

== Customization ==
Early examples of customizable avatars include multi-user systems, including MUDs. Gaia Online has a customizable avatar where users can dress it up as desired. Users may earn credits for completing sponsored surveys or certain tasks to purchase items and upgrades to customize their avatar. Linden Lab's Second Life creates a virtual world in which avatars, homes, decorations, buildings and land are for sale. Less-common items may be designed to appear better than common items, and an experienced player may be identified from a group of new characters before in-game statistics are seen.

=== Avatar Generators ===
To meet the demand for millions of unique, customized avatars, generator tools and services have been created. Many of them, such as the website Picrew, are based around works by original artists. The 2021 Electronic Entertainment Expo featured an avatar creator, to align with its new all-digital nature.

=== Awareness avatars ===
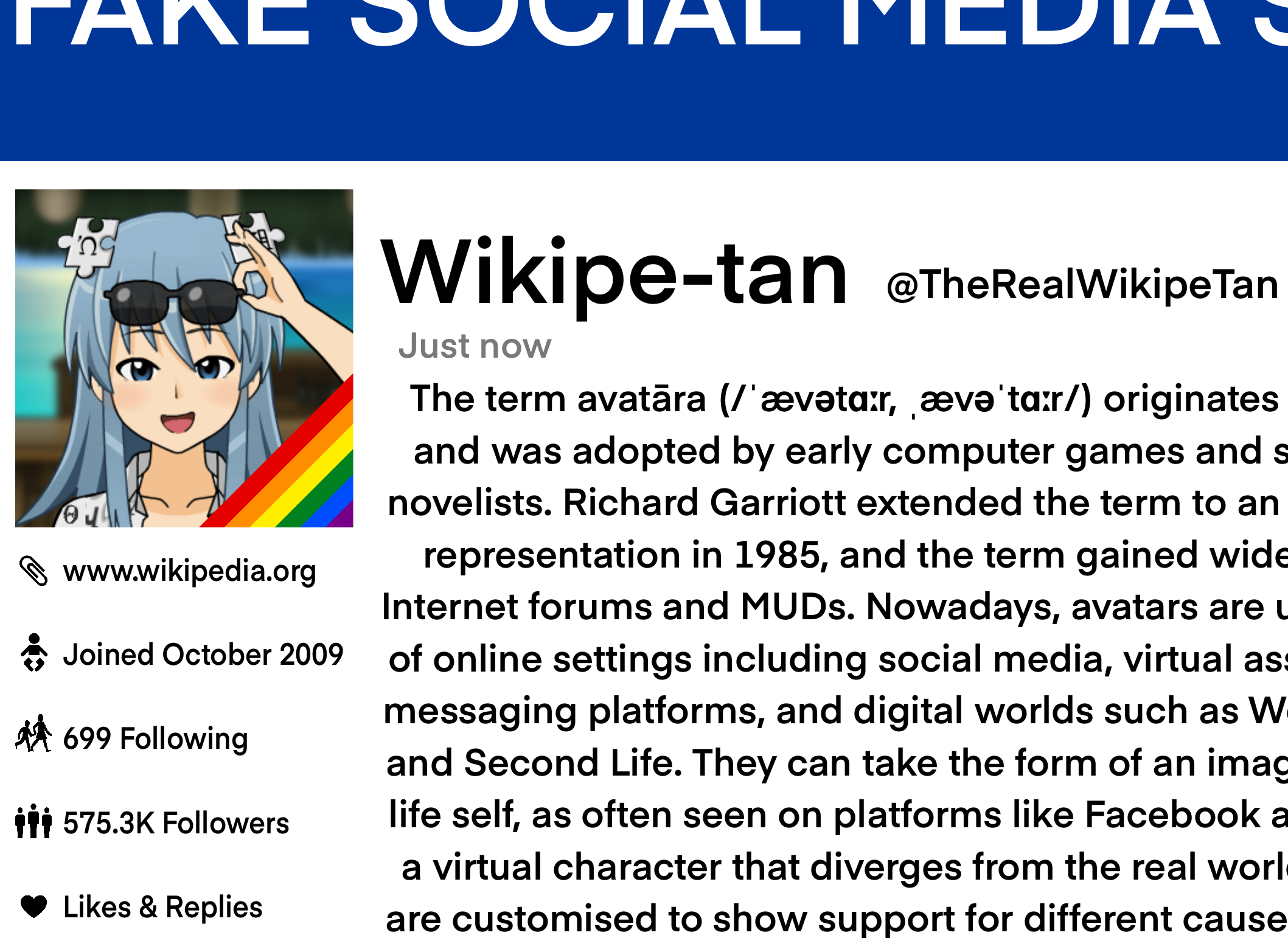
Example user image with Wikipe-tan and a rainbow flag across one corner

Some people add visual details or effects to their avatars to show support for a movement or issue, in a similar way to a physical awareness ribbon.

The awareness avatar may have first been used in the New Zealand Internet Blackout, to protest copyright law changes in New Zealand. Globally, protesters replaced their icons with black squares to show solidarity. The protest was successful and proved the method effective at both raising awareness and effecting change. Campaigns have used this method include:

- Black avatar: February 16–23, 2009 New Zealand Internet Blackout protesting copyright law changes in New Zealand.
- Yellow tint: Beginning June 17, 2009, to protest the increasing size and role of the United States government.
- Green tint: Beginning June 18, 2009 support for Iran election protests.
- French flag tint: Beginning November 13, 2015 to show support for France after the November 2015 Paris attacks.
- During the COVID-19 pandemic, users added surgical masks and respirators on the faces of characters and avatars. Websites such as Facebook officially supported these efforts by adding the option for several frames supporting the COVID-19 vaccine. Conversely, anti-vaccine advocates have used profile frames to state their opposition to it.
- Rainbow patterns to represent membership or solidarity with the LGBT community.

== Academic study ==
Avatars have become an area of study in the world of academics. According to psychiatrist David Brunski, the emergence of online avatars have implications for domains of scholarly research such as technoself studies, which is concerned with all aspects of identity in a technological society. Across the literature, scholars have focused on three overlapping aspects that influence users' perceptions of the social potential of avatars: agency, anthropomorphism, and realism. According to researchers K. L. Novak and J. Fox, researchers must differentiate perceived agency (whether an entity is perceived to be human), anthropomorphism (having human form or behavior), identomorphism (how much the form of the avatar resembles the player), and realism (the perceived viability of something realistically existing). Perceived agency influences people's responses in the interaction regardless of who or what is actually controlling the representation. An earlier meta-analysis of studies comparing agents and avatars found that both agency and perceived agency mattered: representations controlled by humans were more persuasive than those controlled by bots, and representations believed to be controlled by humans were more persuasive than those believed to be controlled by bots.

Additionally, researchers have investigated how anthropomorphic representations influence communicative outcomes and found that more human-like representations are judged more favorably; people consider them more attractive, credible, and competent. Higher levels of anthropomorphism also lead to higher involvement, social presence, and communication satisfaction. Moreover, people communicate more naturally with more anthropomorphic avatars. Anthropomorphism is also tied to social influence, as more human-like representations can be more persuasive.

For the Harvard Business Review, Paul Hemp analysed the effects of avatars on real-world business. He focuses on the game "Second Life", demonstrating that the creators of virtual avatars are willing to spend real money to purchase goods marketed solely to their virtual selves. In addition, research in data collection via Second Life avatars suggested important considerations related to research participant engagement, burden, and retention, as well as accuracy of the data collected.

=== Representation of identity ===
The Journal of Computer-Mediated Communication published a study of the reactions to certain types of avatars by a sample group of human users. The results showed that users commonly chose avatars which were humanoid and matched their gender. The conclusion was that in order to make users feel more "at home" in their avatars, designers should maximise the customizability of visual criteria common to humans, such as skin and hair color, age, gender, hair styles and height. Researchers at York University studied whether avatars reflected a user's real-life personality. Student test groups were able to infer upon extraversion, agreeableness, and neuroticism, but could not infer upon openness and conscientiousness.

Researchers have also studied avatars that differ from real-life identity. Sherry Turkle described a middle-aged man who played an aggressive, confrontational female character in his online communities, displaying personality traits he was embarrassed to display in the offline world. Research by Nick Yee of the Daedelus Project demonstrates that an avatar may differ considerably from a player's offline identity, based on gender. However, most players will make an avatar that is (proportionately) equal to their height (or slightly taller). Turkle has observed that some players seek an emotional connection they cannot establish in the real world. She described a case in which a man with a serious heart condition preventing him from ordinary socializing found acceptance and friendship through his online identity. Others have pointed out similar findings in those with mental disorders making social interaction difficult, such as those with autism or similar disabilities.

== See also ==
- Artificial intelligence and elections
- Deadbot – Avatar of a dead person created by AI
- Michaelmas (novel) – 1977 novel by Algis Budrys
- Microsoft Agent – Software avatar toolkit
- NECA Project
- Online identity – Social identity in an online community
- Persona (user experience) – Personalized fictional characters representing a consumer or user category
- Player character – Character controlled by a game player
- Pointman (user interface) – User interface used in a 3D environment
- Proteus effect – Behavioral effect in virtual worlds
- Ready Player One – 2011 science fiction novel by Ernest Cline
  - Ready Player One (film) – 2018 film by Steven Spielberg
- Thumbnail – Reduced-size versions of images or videos
- Viverse – Virtual reality platform
- VTuber – Streamers that use virtual avatars
- Waifu – Fictional character that one feels attraction to
