= Mirror world =

Digital representation as a software model of real-world environments

A mirror world is a representation of the real world in digital form. It attempts to map real-world structures in a geographically accurate way. Mirror worlds offer a software model of real human environments and their workings. It is very similar to the concept of a digital twin.

The term in relation to digital media is coined by Yale University computer scientist David Gelernter. He first speaks of a hypothetical mirror world in 1991.
