= Oswell =

Oswell may refer to:

- Oswell (given name)
- Oswell (surname)
