= Linden Lab =

American technology company

Coordinates: 37°48′00.96″N 122°24′05.65″W

Linden Research, Inc.

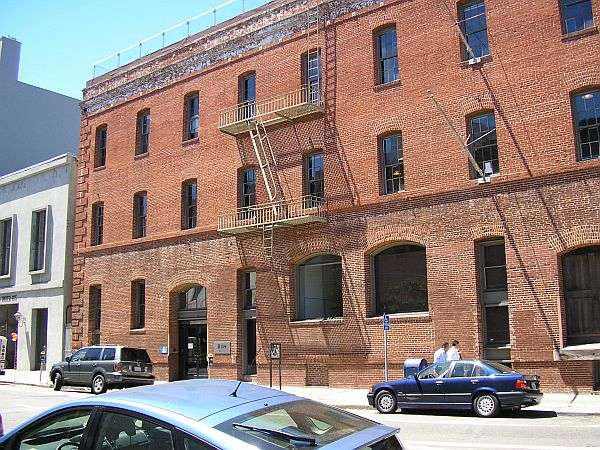
- Linden Lab headquarters in San Francisco
- Trade name: Linden Lab
- Type: Private
- Industry: Technology
- Founded: 1999; 27 years ago
- Founder: Philip Rosedale
- Headquarters: San Francisco, California, United States
- Products: Virtual worlds; Electronic commerce; Software development Video games
- Number of employees: 245
- Website: www.lindenlab.com

Linden Research, Inc., doing business as Linden Lab, is an American technology company that is best known as the developer of Second Life.

The company's head office is in San Francisco, California, with additional offices in Boston, Massachusetts; Seattle, Washington; Davis, California; and Virginia. (Note: The company's offices in Mountain View, Brighton, Singapore, and Amsterdam were closed in 2010. There was an additional office in Linköping, with an unknown closure date.) In addition, the company employs remote workers that communicate and collaborate on projects using Second Life technology.

== History ==
The company, founded in 1999 as Linden Research, employs numerous established high-tech veterans, including former executives from Electronic Arts; eBay; Disney; Adobe Systems; and Apple. The company's founder and original CEO is Philip Rosedale, a former CTO of RealNetworks, one of Time Magazine's 100 Most Influential People in The World in 2007.

The company name "Linden" originates from the street name where the company premises were initially based, at 333 Linden Street in San Francisco. The hexagonal Linden Lab logo is influenced by a lime tree, otherwise known as a Linden or Tilia tree.

In 2008, the company was awarded an Emmy for Second Life in the user-generated content and game modification category. The award was given at the 59th annual Technology & Engineering Emmy Awards. Philip Rosedale, chairman of Linden Lab, accepted the award.

Although Linden Lab's Second Life platform was not the first online virtual world, it has gained a large amount of attention due to its expanding user base and unique policy that allows participants to own the intellectual property rights to the in-world content they create. The company's transition from scrappy upstart to success is detailed in the book The Making of Second Life written by former employee Wagner James Au.

Although many people have assumed that the inspiration for Second Life originated from Rosedale's exposure to Neal Stephenson's novel Snow Crash, he has suggested that his vision of virtual worlds predates that book and that he conducted some early virtual world experiments during his college years at the University of California San Diego, where he studied physics.

Rosedale's strong coding skills eventually resulted in the creation of a video compression technology that would later be acquired by RealNetworks, where he was made CTO at the age of 27. While at RealNetworks, Rosedale's ambition to create a virtual world was resurrected and recharged by technological advances in computing and his attendance at the popular music and arts festival Burning Man.

With the help of a financial windfall that he reaped from his time at RealNetworks, Rosedale formed Linden Lab in 1999. His initial focus was on the development of hardware that would enable computer users to be fully immersed in a 360 degree virtual reality experience. In its earliest form, the company struggled to produce a commercial version of "The Rig", which was realized in prototype form as a clunky steel contraption with several computer monitors that users could wear on their shoulders. That vision soon morphed into the software-based application Linden World, where computer users could participate in task-based games and socialization in a 3D online environment. That effort would eventually transform into the better-known, user-centered Second Life.

During a 2001 meeting with investors, Rosedale noticed that the participants were particularly responsive to the collaborative, creative potential of Second Life. As a result, the initial objective-driven, gaming focus of Second Life was shifted to a more user-created, community-driven experience.

In October 2010, Rosedale announced he was leaving his position as CEO.

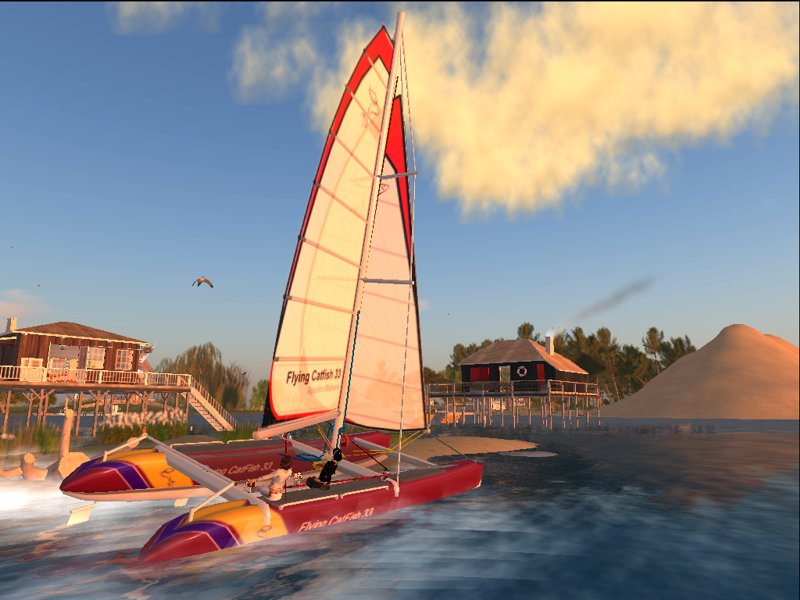
Two players out on the water in Second Life in 2012

In September 2012, Linden Lab announced two new games: Creatorverse (for iPad) and Patterns (for desktops).

In January 2013, Linden Lab purchased the game Blocksworld for iPad, a shared virtual world built of blocks.

Rod Humble, appointed CEO in December 2010, announced his departure on Facebook on 24 January 2014, stating that he would be leaving Linden Lab to pursue founding a new company that will "make art, entertainment and unusual things!".

In February 2014, Linden Lab announced that its new CEO was Ebbe Altberg, former COO of BranchOut. He died in June 2021 after battling a long illness.

In late 2023, it became apparent that Linden Lab had sold the rights of Blocksworld to Ukrainian studio Fortell Games. While the purchase is yet to be announced officially, activity on the games long inactive social media, Steam and Apple App Store pages point all but confirm the acquisition.

== Corporate culture ==
Linden Lab utilized another internal tool, the Distributor, that enabled all employees to distribute "points" to projects that they deemed worthy of development and resource support. Each point has a financial value that is based on each quarter's financial performance. As a result, key stakeholders in the projects with high point values received a distributed monetary payoff at the end of the quarter for successfully completed projects. The Distributor was discontinued after Rosedale left the company.

In addition, each employee's quarterly performance review is published on a Wikipedia-like internal website that all other employees may see.

Employees of Linden Lab, who are easily identifiable in-world by their avatars' last name "Linden", have participated in several collaborative events with Second Life users. For example, the company holds an annual holiday "snowball fight" where users are encouraged to throw virtual snowballs at Linden Lab employees.

== Litigation ==
In 2006, Pennsylvania lawyer Marc Bragg brought a lawsuit (Bragg v. Linden Lab) against Linden Lab when his Second Life account "Marc Woebegone" was disabled by administrators. The case was settled out of court.

== List of products ==
- Second Life
- Sansar
- Blocksworld
- Patterns
