= NeighborhoodScout =

US real estate database

- Type: Private
- Founded: 2002
- Headquarters: Worcester, Massachusetts, United States
- Key people: Andrew Schiller (founder)
- Parent: CoreLogic
- Website: neighborhoodscout.com

NeighborhoodScout is a website and online database of U.S. neighborhood analytics created in 2002. The site offers neighborhood reports and a search function.

The website is owned and operated by Location, Inc., a Rhode Island corporation headquartered in Worcester, Massachusetts.

== History ==
Andrew Schiller conceived NeighborhoodScout while working on his doctorate in geography at Clark University in Worcester, Massachusetts.

In an interview with Inman News, Schiller discusses that he used to move around often for jobs or for school, and was often in a position to make expensive decisions about the best places in which to buy or rent. “But asking friends or real estate professionals always led to answers that were an inaccurate mix of what my friend or agent thought I wanted, combined with what they themselves want in a neighborhood. As a result, the suggestions were never right.” Schiller founded Location, Inc. in 2000 and launched Neighborhoodscout.com in 2002.

By 2006, Location, Inc. reported that NeighborhoodScout had nearly 70,000 subscribers and had served over 1 million users since inception. In 2015, NeighborhoodScout reported to serve over 1 million users each month. NeighborhoodScout earns revenue from customer subscriptions and advertising. They also refer homebuyers to real estate agents and collect a referral fee when they transact on a home.

== Media attention ==
In 2003, The Wall Street Journal used NeighborhoodScout in an example of how more homebuyers are turning to the web, rather than their agents, to find real estate data to fuel their decisions. In 2008, real estate mogul Barbara Corcoran listed NeighborhoodScout as one of the "best real estate sites." NeighborhoodScout lists have been published in Bloomberg Business, Forbes, CNBC, TIME, the Wall Street Journal, CBS and CNN Money.

In 2011, financial journalist Stacey Bradford of CBS MoneyWatch featured NeighborhoodScout and CEO Schiller in a How-To article about finding the best neighborhood. Bradford counseled readers that sites like NeighborhoodScout are helpful at providing the type of information about areas that real estate agents are prohibited from divulging because of the Fair Housing Act.

== Controversy over racial and ethnic data ==
In 2014, NeighborhoodScout released a feature that allows users to filter neighborhood by crime statistics, school quality, housing values, and demographic characteristics such as languages, ethnicity, race, and income. The feature was criticized by the National Fair Housing Alliance who were concerned that showing racial statistics on real estate websites may steer homebuyers to filter their searches based on race. The CEO of NeighborhoodScout contested the claim it violates the Fair Housing Act, and said the site could actually help to promote integration. In an interview with Inman News on the topic, Schiller noted that searching for areas based on race and ethnicity is “not necessarily contemptible,” and provided an example of a Korean customer who used NeighborhoodScout to find areas populated by other Koreans.
