= Cars.com =

Automotive classified website

- Website type: Online motoring
- Available in: English
- Owner: Cars.com Inc.
- Revenue: ▲US$723 million (2025)
- Net income: ▼US$20.1 million (2025)
- Website: www.cars.com
- Commercial: Yes
- Launched: June 1998; 28 years ago
- Current status: Active
- Content license: Yes

Cars.com Inc.
- Type: Public company
- Traded as: NYSE: CARS; S&P 600 component
- Industry: Automotive marketing services
- Founded: May 2017; 9 years ago
- Founders: Mitch Golub; William Swislow; Alex Vetter
- Headquarters: Chicago, Illinois, U.S.
- Area served: United States
- Key people: Alex Vetter, CEO and President
- Products: Cars.com; Auto.com; PickupTrucks.com; NewCars.com
- Services: Automotive classifieds
- Divisions: Auto.com; PickupTrucks.com; NewCars.com; DealerRater
- Subsidiaries: DR Media Holdings, LLC
- Website: Cars.com

Cars.com is an automotive classified website focused on the United States that launched in June 1998 and now is the second largest automotive classified site. It is also known for being the most expensive domain ever sold. It was sold in 2014 for $872 million. Its headquarters are located in Chicago, Illinois. Cars.com also offers expert car reviews, news and research from its dedicated Editorial team.

== History ==
A 2003 Library Journal survey of automobile-related websites described cars.com as ranked the site positively, noting staff-written reviews that are signed, dated, detailed, and illustrated. In 2004 the website announced a partnership with Kelley Blue Book and commenced national advertising. In October 2007, it announced plans for its largest marketing campaign ever in early 2008. In the same month, Yahoo! announced plans to receive listings from Cars.com for their Yahoo! Autos service.

Cars.com was previously owned by Classified Ventures, LLC, a joint venture between Gannett, The McClatchy Company, Tribune, Graham Holdings, and A.H. Belo. On August 5, 2014, Gannett announced that it would buy out the remaining stakes in Classified Ventures it did not already own, for $2.5 billion.

In July 2016, Cars.com acquired dealer and service shop rating site DealerRater.

Cars.com was included in the spin-off of Gannett's broadcasting properties as Tegna, Inc. On May 4, 2017, Tegna shareholders approved a plan to spin off Cars.com as a new, publicly traded company; they received a share of the new company, which began trading on the NYSE beginning on June 1, 2017, for every 3 Tegna shares they owned.

In February 2018, Cars.com announced the acquisition of Dealer Inspire, a digital marketing agency serving automotive dealerships located in Naperville, Illinois.

== Marketing ==
Cars.com has regularly advertised during the Super Bowl, screening adverts in consecutive years.

== Editorial Team ==
Cars.com’s Editorial team is a source for automotive news, car reviews, videos, comparison tests and more. The Editorial team offers expert reviews and car-shopping content. The Editorial team operates independently of Cars.com’s advertising, sales and sponsored content departments and does not accept free trips or gifts from automakers. Cars.com’s Editorial team is responsible for the American-Made Index, which tracks the most-American new cars made. Cars.com editor, Mike Hanley, is a juror on the North American Car, Truck and Utility Vehicle of the Year panel of automotive experts, while its Editor-in-Chief Jennifer Newman is a juror on the World Car Award panel. Cars.com editors Jennifer Geiger and Jennifer Newman are certified child passenger safety technicians and perform Cars.com’s Car Seat Checks.

== Television ==
Since July 1998, Cars.com has been in partnership with the Magliozzis of Car Talk and the website includes a Cartalk advice section.

Cars.com also partners with MotorWeek on PBS to provide online access to MotorWeek reviews.
