= Jason A. Archinaco =

American lawyer (born 1970)

- Born: 1970 (age 55–56)
- Occupation: Attorney

Jason A. Archinaco (born 1970) is an American attorney known for the handling of the first virtual property lawsuit in the United States, Bragg v. Linden Research, Inc. That case is believed to have resolved confidentially.

Archinaco also handled the case of John Carl v. AllianceBernstein and Lewis Sanders that resulted in a $12 million verdict for Carl in FINRA arbitration including $2 million in punitive damages. It is believed to be the largest single-Claimant paid verdict in FINRA history with no appeal ever being filed.

Archinaco is also known for representing whistleblower Timothy P. Flynn against his former company UBS Financial Services Inc. In a complaint filed with the US Department of Labor, Flynn alleged that shortly after cooperating with regulators and providing testimony with regard to auction rate securities, he was retaliated against, being locked out of his office and forced to resign. UBS settled its auction rate securities issues with the State of Massachusetts for $37 million and $22 billion with the SEC, in addition to a fine of $150 million.

The Flynn case drew national attention after the Department of Labor asked Flynn to prove that UBS Financial Securities was covered by the Sarbanes-Oxley Act since it was not a publicly traded entity, only a subsidiary of one. Subsequently, a number of Wall Street Journal articles were written by Jennifer Levitz, culminating in a joint letter written by Senators Patrick Leahy and Charles Grassley opposing the Department of Labor's restricted view of the Sarbanes-Oxley whistleblower protections.

In October 2010, Archinaco obtained a FINRA arbitration award of $925,000 for whistleblower Michelle Ford. Ford had complained to her employer about what she believed were prohibited transactions in a 401(k) plan and improper sales of annuities. After she complained to superiors, she was retaliated against, culminating in her termination. Ford's employer interfered with her Green Card application, leading to her removal from the United States. $100,000 of the arbitration award was for discovery sanctions that Archinaco described as "classic shenanigans" like hiding documents or producing them "late at night the day before the next day's hearings . . . ." The award was paid in full with no appeal being filed.
