= Blocksworld =

2012 sandbox video game

- Developers: BoldaiAB (2012-2013); Linden Lab (2013-2020); Fortell Games Inc., Blocksworld LLC (2023-)
- Publishers: Linden Lab, BoldaiAB (2012 Nordic release), Fortell Games (2023)
- Engine: Unity
- Platforms: iOS; Windows; macOS; Meta Quest
- Release: Original: NR: November 21, 2012; WW: July 26, 2013; Revival: WW: TBC
- Genre: Sandbox
- Mode: Single-player

Blocksworld is a physics-based 3D sandbox video game developed by BoldaiAB and Linden Lab released originally for the iPad on November 21, 2012 in Nordic countries, and later worldwide on July 26, 2013. It was released for the iPhone in 2016, and later via Steam early access on September 25, 2017.

As of 2020, Blocksworld is absent from Linden Lab's website (excluding previous press releases), and servers were fully shut down on June 17, 2020. It was subsequently removed from the App Store and later pulled from Steam on July 2, 2020. In 2023, Blocksworld was acquired by Fortell Games Inc, whom confirmed through the Blocksworld X account that they planned to relaunch the game in the third quarter of 2024. As of 2026, the game has yet to release but is under active development.

== Gameplay ==
The "build" screen. The player has placed down some blocks and a "Blockster". The build UI and action tab are visible on each side of the screen.

In Blocksworld, players could build using 3D building blocks that could be combined to construct simple or complex creations. Players could also use "action blocks" and a drag-and-drop visual programming tool to add interactivity to their creations. Examples included drivable cars, flyable jets, and playable games with win/lose conditions, health systems, and other attributes. Players could also upload their creations for others to play. Blocksworld also included a feature where players could redeem a certain number of in-game coins for real money.

Not only did Blocksworld serve as a tool to make games, a full-sized community and an online marketplace for models (that can be bought with coins, the in-game currency) was included, where players could play worlds (community-made games) that other users made. Before Blocksworld was shut down by Linden in 2020, over 38 million worlds were hosted by the Blocksworld servers. Blocksworld also implemented community moderation; newly published worlds had to get "approved", and members of the community could "moderate" pending worlds by simply playtesting the world and approving or rejecting it. Another feature, the Prize Wheel, allowed players to spin a wheel and get a new block, texture, etc.

In 2016, a new form of currency, "gems", was added into Blocksworld. Gems were only used for the Lucky Prize Wheel, which is the same as the Prize Wheel, but instead it has more valuable prizes. They could be obtained via the normal Prize Wheel and could not be purchased with real-world money. In terms of community involvement, besides moderation, Blocksworld used to implement "community challenges", where members could partake in contests to see who had the best creation based on the contest's selected theme. Later in the game's lifespan, these were no longer held.

When building, 10 sub-menus are listed (as shown in the accompanying image), and their respective blocks are able to be placed into the world or the action panel (a sub-menu that hosts simple coding tools used to give the world interactive features). They are as follows:

- Blocks: Simple blocks that are the foundation to building models.
- Models: Creations made with blocks that can be imported into the world.
- Props: Premade blocks that have the shape of trees, landforms, food, and objects that cannot be made with true blocks.
- Colors: Colors set a desired color to the block. While an infinite amount of them is supplied when building, they were originally finite in earlier versions of the app.
- Textures: Similar to colors but are instead decals that can be overlaid onto colors. Unlike colors, textures are always finite.
- Blocksters: Humanoid characters that can be made playable or nonplayable. Animated Blocksters, mini-Blocksters, skeletons, and headless blocksters also fit the category.
- Gear: A subcategory of Props; includes helmets, swords, or guns that can be applied onto Blocksters.
- Action Blocks: These blocks can perform a respective action, such as motors, tank treads, wheels, hinges, and rockets.
- Actions: These can be used inside a block's action panel. When playing a world, they tell blocks to perform actions such as speaking, exploding, disappearing and reappearing, sparkling, etc. Controls such as a joystick and buttons are also included. An infinite amount is supplied.
- Sound Effects: Audio blocks that can be inserted into a block’s action panel. Sounds such as horns, exclamations, animal calls, and nature sounds are supplied. An infinite amount is supplied.

Licensed Hasbro sets including content from My Little Pony, Transformers, and G.I. Joe, as well as characters from Legends of Oz: Dorothy's Return, were available for purchase on the app.

== Development ==
Release timeline
2012	Launched in Nordic countries by BoldaiAB
2013	Launched globally by Linden Lab for iPad
2014
2015
2016	Added to the App Store for iOS, WebGL version released
2017	Added to Steam
2018
2019
2020	Servers are shut down
2021
2022
2023	Acquired by Fortell Games

Blocksworld was initially developed by Swedish independent video game developer BoldaiAB. Originally slated to release in summer 2012, the game was presented as part of the Nordic Game 2012 conference, where BoldaiAB was awarded a 10,000-euro investment from the Nordic Game Fund. A paid version of the game was later released on November 21, 2012 in Sweden, Finland, Denmark, and Norway, and was originally intended to release worldwide on December 13, 2012 for $0.99 USD. However, it was later pushed back when the US-based Linden Lab acquired BoldaiAB. For the subsequent global release, the game was repositioned as a freemium offering where players had the option to purchase premium sets and games, additional building objects and pieces, coins, and other upgrades and extras for a small fee.

On March 3, 2016, Linden Lab released a press release announcing Blocksworld's expansion to iPhone devices. It was later added to Steam on September 25, 2017.

Prior to its shutdown in 2020, Linden Lab paused development and promotion on Blocksworld, with its last significant update having been released in March 2018. This was attributed to Linden Lab's focus on other projects, including Second Life and Sansar.

== Legacy ==
Despite the game's shutdown in 2020, it still retains an active player base. Blocksworld: The Secondary Server, also known simply as Blocksworld 2, is an unofficial fan revival project which started in 2019. In 2026, however, the founder of Blocksworld 2 has announced the shutdown of the main servers, citing lack of motivation and time to continue the project. Though, the community co-owners have also stated that there will be ways for players to self-host their own Blocksworld 2 servers.

Martin Magni, one of the developers of the BoldaiAB version of Blocksworld, released what is considered a successor to Blocksworld in 2020, called Fancade. Fancade shares many of the same features Blocksworld had, such as the ability for players to create their own games as well as playing others.

== Fortell Games acquisition ==
In August 2023, it was rumored that Blocksworld had been acquired by Fortell Games Inc, a spinoff studio of Beatshapers located in Kyiv, Ukraine, and Santa Monica, California, after it was noticed the game's publisher changed on the Apple App Store. This was later backed up further when the Steam page was updated to list Fortell Games and "Blocksworld LLC" as developers.

On November 27, 2023, Blocksworld's official Twitter account posted a GIF of a heart monitor screen after years of inactivity, followed up the day after with a post on the similarly inactive Instagram account. On December 2, it was noticed that the game's official website had been edited to now include a beating heart instead of redirecting to the Linden Lab website. As of December 17, the website now shows a blue background and bouncing icons, some being direct links to the game's social media pages and merch store.

Several days later, on December 9, an official Google Forms survey was posted, asking users various questions on how the revival could be handled in terms of monetization, restored uploads, and additional features, suggesting the revival's early development. The following day, an official merch store went live.

On December 20, the official Blocksworld YouTube channel received its first upload in six years, showcasing several vehicles created within the game. Further activity continued, including multiple comments made on Reddit by a developer's account, and various YouTube Shorts on the aforementioned channel.

On April 3, 2024, a Steam community post was released by Fortell Games, announcing a Kickstarter to begin development. The Kickstarter was released on 2 May 2024.

On April 20, 2024, in response to a Twitter user asking when the game would release, the Blocksworld account stated in that the game's revival is scheduled for Quarter 3 of 2024. According to the Kickstarter, the planned release date is October 2024. As of May 30, there are no plans for release in Russia or Belarus due to their involvement in the ongoing war in Ukraine. The project achieved its funding goal on May 29, 2024, and on June 1, 2024, it was fully funded by 114.46%. However, the game has still yet to be released.
