= Brad Inman =

Brad Inman may refer to:

- Brad Inman (footballer) (born 1991), footballer who plays for Western United
- Bradley Inman, Internet entrepreneur and founder of several companies
