= Oswell (surname) =

Oswell is a surname. Notable people with the surname include:

- Francis Oswell (1920–2003), Australian architect
- Jason Oswell (born 1992), English footballer
- William Cotton Oswell (1818–1893), English explorer

== See also ==
- Orwell (surname)
