= The Maine Edge =

Newspaper in Bangor, Maine

- Type: Weekly newspaper
- Format: Tabloid
- Owner: Edge Media Group
- Publisher: Michael Fern
- Editor: Allen Adams
- Founded: 2006
- Language: English
- Headquarters: Bangor, Maine, U.S.
- Circulation: 18,250
- Price: Free
- Website: themaineedge.com

The Maine Edge was an 18,000+ circulation free weekly lifestyle/cultural arts publication distributed by Edge Media Group in Bangor, Maine.

== History and format ==
The Edge, as it was commonly called by readers, was created in part due to the loss of readership among young people in the Bangor area, a problem afflicting many major newspapers across the country. Similar to publications including RedEye in Chicago and Quick (newspaper) in Dallas, the publishers began The Edge in an effort to pull readers back into readership and serve a niche not being serviced by other media in the area. The Edge appeared in December 2006 after the daily newspaper in Bangor, the Bangor Daily News, suffered a series of cutbacks in personnel. Citing declining advertising revenue, the BDN, as it's referred to locally, cut a series of positions in the editorial department and closed several bureaus.

The Edge publishes each Wednesday, and is a member of The Associated Press and the New England Press Association.

== See also ==
- WLBZ
- Journalism
- Mass media
- Newspaper
