= Dietary Supplements (database) =

The PubMed Dietary Supplement Subset (PMDSS) is a joint project between the National Institutes of Health (NIH) National Library of Medicine (NLM) and the NIH Office of Dietary Supplements (ODS). PMDSS is designed to help people search for academic journal articles related to dietary supplement literature. The subset was created using a search strategy that includes terms provided by the Office of Dietary Supplements, and selected journals indexed for PubMed that include significant dietary supplement related content. It succeeds the International Bibliographic Information on Dietary Supplements (IBIDS) database, 1999–2010, which was a collaboration between the Office of Dietary Supplements and the U.S. Department of Agriculture's National Agricultural Library.

== The Subset ==
ODS and NLM partnered to create this Dietary Supplement Subset of NLM's PubMed database. PubMed provides access to citations from the MEDLINE database and additional life science academic journals. It also includes links to many full-text articles at journal Web sites and other related Web resources.

The subset is designed to limit search results to citations from a broad spectrum of dietary supplement literature including vitamin, mineral, phytochemical, ergogenic, botanical, and herbal supplements in human nutrition and animal models. The subset will retrieve dietary supplement-related citations on topics including, but not limited to:

- chemical composition;
- biochemical role and function — both in vitro and in vivo;
- clinical trials;
- health and adverse effects;
- fortification;
- traditional Chinese medicine and other folk/ethnic supplement practices;
- cultivation of botanical products used as dietary supplements; as well as,
- surveys of dietary supplement use.

The PMDSS is a free service and can be accessed either directly through the ODS Website or in PubMed using the Dietary Supplement filter (formerly referred to as a Limit).

== History ==
Dietary supplements were first regulated in by the Federal Food Drug and Cosmetic Act of 1938. In 1941 the United States Food and Drug Administration proffered definitions for dietary supplementary foods which included minerals, vitamins and other specialized supplements. In the early 1970s the FDA tried to restrict the definition of dietary supplements to essential nutrients such as vitamins and minerals. However, as the 1970s progressed, a 1974 court decision and legislation that passed in 1976 would not allow such action. In 1994, against recommendations from the FDA, the Dietary Supplement Health Education Act (DSHEA) was passed. This act defined dietary supplements, made safety a matter of regulation, stated the requirements for approved third party literature, and regulated label content.

=== Office of Dietary Supplements ===
DSHEA mandated the establishment of the Office of Dietary Supplements (ODS) at the National Institutes of Health. The mission of ODS is to strengthen knowledge and understanding of dietary supplements by evaluating scientific information, stimulating and supporting research, disseminating research results, and educating the public to foster an enhanced quality of life and health for the U.S. population. In support of this mission the ODS created two databases one of which was named the International Bibliographic Information on Dietary Supplements (IBIDS) database. The other database, Computer Access to Research on Dietary Supplements (CARDS), is a database of federally funded research projects pertaining to dietary supplements. The IBIDS database was retired in 2010 and the PMDSS was launched to continue the ODS mission to disseminate dietary supplement-related research results.

The database was discontinued in April 2020.

== See also ==
- Natural Standard
- Examine.com
