= Ben Caballero =

American real estate agent and entrepreneur

Ben Caballero is an American entrepreneur and real estate agent, and the founder and CEO of HomesUSA.com, a Dallas-based real estate brokerage that serves as the exclusive listing agent for production homebuilders in Texas. He holds three Guinness World Records titles for the most annual home sale transactions through MLS by an individual sell-side real estate agent.

In 2015, he became the first individual real estate agent to exceed US$1 billion in annual home sales. He surpassed $3 billion in 2022. In a 2025 profile, Commercial Observer reported his cumulative career transaction volume at approximately $27 billion.

== Early life and military service ==
Caballero is a second-generation Cuban American from Tampa, Florida, where both of his parents were real estate brokers. He is a United States Air Force veteran. In 1960, he moved to Dallas, Texas. He became a real estate broker at the age of 21 and worked as a home builder for 18 years before returning to brokerage full time.

== Career ==
=== Business model ===
Caballero serves as the exclusive listing agent for more than 60 production homebuilders in Houston, the Dallas–Fort Worth metroplex, Austin, and San Antonio. Unlike traditional real estate agents, Caballero does not represent buyers or individual home sellers and works only on the sell side; he told Inman in 2025, "We don't have any agents helping buyers or listing consumer homes." His brokerage charges builders a flat fee per closing rather than a percentage commission. Each listing is recorded under his individual agent license rather than a team, a structure that The Real Deal and The Hustle have identified as central to his ranking performance. Caballero has described HomesUSA.com's primary value as its technology platform for MLS listing management and marketing workflows for production homebuilders.

=== Production records and rankings ===
Caballero completed 2,095 transaction sides totaling $737 million in sales volume in 2013, according to Inman. He became the first individual real estate agent to exceed $1 billion in annual home sales in 2015. He surpassed $2 billion in 2018, 2019, and 2020. His production declined in 2021 to approximately $1.98 billion across 4,671 sales before rebounding to $3.06 billion in 2022, when he became the first individual agent to exceed $3 billion in a single year.

In 2016, Caballero received his first Guinness World Records title for "most annual home sale transactions through MLS by an individual sell-side real estate agent," recognizing 3,556 verified home sales in a single year. He broke his own record in 2018 with 5,801 sales totaling $2.27 billion, and again in 2020 with 6,438 sales totaling $2.46 billion, earning a third Guinness title.

=== SpecDeck ===
SpecDeck is HomesUSA.com's MLS listing management platform for production homebuilders, launched in December 2023. Dallas Innovates reported in 2024 that the platform uses strategic automation and generative AI to help create listings and manage listing workflows. In May 2025, Inman reported that Caballero worked with about 70 builders in Texas.

== Recognition ==
Caballero was named Most Innovative Real Estate Agent by Inman News in 2013, was a finalist for the award in 2016 and 2018, and was named an Inman industry influencer in 2017. In 2024, he was named a Real Estate Newsmaker in the Achievers category by RISMedia, and HomesUSA.com was named to the HousingWire Tech100 Real Estate list, which recognizes technology organizations in the housing industry.
