= ConsumerLab.com =

American publisher of health data

- Type: Private
- Industry: Book Publisher (NAICS code 51130)
- Founded: 1999
- Headquarters: 333 Mamaroneck Avenue White Plains, NY, United States
- Key people: Tod Cooperman, M.D. (President) Mark Anderson, Ph.D. (VP of Research) Lisa K. Sabin (VP of Business Development)
- Services: Publisher of test results and guides for dietary supplement, brand licensing and advertising.
- Website: www.consumerlab.com

ConsumerLab.com, LLC. is a privately held American company registered in White Plains, NY. It is a publisher of test results on health, wellness, and nutrition products. Consumer Labs is not a laboratory, but contracts studies to outside testing laboratories. It purchases dietary supplement products and other consumer goods directly from public storefronts and online retailers, contracts for testing by private laboratories, and publishes reports based on the results. It primarily derives revenue from the sale of subscriptions to its online publications, which are paywalled. Other sources of revenue include a proprietary certification program, licensing fees, contents re-publication license fees, and advertising.

In 2000, ConsumerLab.com generated media attention when its testing of ginseng products revealed substantial pesticide contamination in many products. In 2008, they found 12 red yeast rice product samples to contain widely varying amounts of active ingredients and some included toxins. The testing was repeated in 2014 and 2018 with similar findings. In 2011, they found that two of three coconut water products contained less sodium and magnesium than claimed on the Nutrition Facts label. This spurred a class-action lawsuit against Vita Coco's manufacturer, All Market Inc., which was eventually settled for $10 million in 2012. In 2012, a ConsumerLab.com study reported that a tested sample of the energy drink 5-hour Energy contained about 207 mg of caffeine, which is substantially more than its advertised claim of "about as much caffeine as a cup of the leading premium coffee," which the U. S. Food and Drug Administration (FDA) states to be generally 80–100 mg.

== History ==
ConsumerLab.com was founded in 1999 by Tod Cooperman M.D., a graduate of the Boston University School of Medicine.

== Personnel ==
William Obermeyer helped found ConsumerLab.com and served as V.P. for Research until 2012. Obermeyer worked as a Natural Products Chemist testing dietary supplements within the Center for Drug Evaluation and Research (CDER), part of FDA, for nine years prior to joining ConsumerLab.com in 1999. As of 2007, Obermeyer worked as an advisor to the company.

The current V.P. for research is Mark L. Anderson, a pharmacologist/toxicologist who was previously Director of Research and Development at Triarco Industries, a manufacturer of ingredients for the food, beverage, and dietary supplement/nutraceutical industries.

== Products and services ==
ConsumerLab.com reports that its main revenue is from online subscriptions. Other revenue-generating products include books, survey reports and the sale of licenses to publish its proprietary information. Tests are not conducted by ConsumerLab.com, but are contracted to independent laboratories. A 2000 New York Times article reports one of the laboratories is Alpha Chemical and Biomedical Laboratories in Petaluma, CA.

Products to be tested are purchased directly from retail stores, online retailers, mail-order catalogs, or multi-level marketing companies. Products are not accepted from manufacturers, and are retested every few years. A 2004 Journal of the Medical Library Association review noted that "approximately half of the [laboratory test results] reports indicate the date the review was posted". For a fee, ConsumerLab.com offers a voluntary certification program. Products that pass the certification can use the "CL Seal of Approval" for which there is a licensing fee. Vendors of brand name products named in its reports can, for an advertising fee, be listed in a "Where to Buy" section which is clearly marked as advertising.

== Research and Publications ==
In the analysis "[A Multi-Year Heavy Metal Analysis of 72 Dark Chocolate and Cocoa Products in the USA](https://doi.org/10.3389/fnut.2024.1366231)," published in Frontiers in Nutrition (2024), researchers from ConsumerLab.com and George Washington University analyzed lead (Pb), cadmium (Cd), and arsenic (As) in cocoa products tested from 2014 to 2022. The research revealed that 43% of products exceeded California's Proposition 65 levels for Pb, and 35% for Cd, although 97.2% met less stringent US FDA standards for Pb. Products labeled as "organic" were more likely to have higher levels of both lead and cadmium. This underscores the need for vigilant heavy metal monitoring in cocoa products, especially those labeled organic, to ensure consumer safety.

== Government and legal interactions ==
In January 2005, the Council for Responsible Nutrition (CRN), a "trade association representing dietary supplement and functional food manufacturers and ingredient suppliers," registered a complaint with the Federal Trade Commission against ConsumerLab.com. It alleged the "entire business model" of ConsumerLab.com "represents an egregious form of consumer fraud and deception." CRN requested the FTC to require ConsumerLab.com to disclose all test results, identify the labs that perform its tests, and change its company name to avoid implying that it does its own testing. On 15 March 2005, the FTC stated: "staff is not recommending agency action at this time," and no subsequent action has occurred.

On 9 March 2006, Dr. Tod Cooperman spoke at a House of Representatives Committee on Government Reform hearing on the Regulation of Dietary Supplements. In his statement, he said the most common problem identified from their tests were "lack of ingredient in a supplement or a very poor quality ingredient in a supplement" (i.e., potency) and "contamination with lead and other heavy metals and pesticides" (i.e., adulteration). On 26 May 2010, Dr. Cooperman reported similar problems in a panel statement to a "Dietary Supplements: What Seniors Need To Know" hearing at the U.S. Senate Special Committee on Aging.

ConsumerLab.com filed suit against CRN alleging CRN's publication of its complaint letter to FTC was defamation, infliction of intentional harm, and six other causes. In May 2006, the New York Supreme Court dismissed this suit for failure to state a claim for all but the defamation allegation. The dispute was eventually settled and dismissed.

On 1 June 2017, Dr. Mark Anderson spoke at the National Institutes of Health Office of Dietary Supplements Research Practicum.

== Dietary supplement testing ==
ConsumerLab.com seeks to verify the accuracy of manufacturers' claims of supplement contents. ConsumerLab.com tries to communicate the testing methods, quality criteria/standards, and results in common, layman's terms. Consumer Labs is not a laboratory, but contracts studies to outside independent laboratories.

=== Notable findings ===
In 2000, ConsumerLab.com's testing of Ginseng products revealed substantial pesticide contamination in many products, creating significant media attention.

In 2008, ConsumerLab.com submitted 12 red yeast rice product samples to a third party testing lab and found the supplements contained widely varying amounts of active ingredients and some included toxins. The testing was repeated in 2014 and 2018 with similar findings.

In 2011, a ConsumerLab.com study found that two of three coconut water products, commonly promoted for hydration and electrolyte balance, contained less sodium and magnesium than claimed on the label. This spurred a class-action lawsuit against Vita Coco's manufacturer, All Market Inc., which was eventually settled for $10 million in 2012.

In 2012, a ConsumerLab.com study on energy drinks reported that a tested sample of 5-hour Energy contained about 207 mg of caffeine. This may be considered notably higher than the advertised "about as much caffeine as a cup of the leading premium coffee," as the FDA states that a cup of coffee usually contains 80–100 mg of caffeine and a cup of Starbucks coffee contains 130 mg of caffeine.

== See also ==
- Dietary supplement
- Examine.com
- Natural Standard
- Labdoor, Inc
