= Alan McHughen =

American botanist and molecular biologist

- Born: April 13, 1954 (age 72); Ottawa, Ontario, Canada
- Citizenship: United States
- Education: Oxford University
- Scientific career
- Fields: Botany; Genetic engineering
- Workplaces: McHughen Research Group University of California, Riverside

Alan G. McHughen (born 13 April 1954) is a Canadian-American molecular biologist known for his scholarship in DNA technologies and work developing United States and Canadian regulations governing the safety of genetically engineered crops and foods.

== Early life and education ==
- Dalhousie University, B.Sc. Biology/Biochemistry 1976
- Oxford University, D.Phil., Developmental Botany, 1979
- Yale University, Postdoctoral Fellow 1979–1982

== Career and research ==
McHughen served as an Assistant then full Professor and Research Scientist with the University of Saskatchewan from 1982 to 2002. He currently leads the McHughen Research Group at the University of California, Riverside, in the Department of Botany and Plant Sciences.

From 2011 to 2012 McHughen served as a Jefferson Science Fellow and Senior Policy Analyst in the Executive Office of the President in the Obama administration.

McHughen is a past-President of the International Society for Biosafety Research, a fellow with the American College of Nutrition (2002), a AAAS Fellow with the American Association for the Advancement of Science (2010), and member of the American Society of Plant Biology.

== Awards and honors ==
McHughen received the Robert Anderson Fellowship in Biochemistry from Yale University and a research fellowship from the Royal Commission for the Exhibition of 1851. He also received the Science in Society Book of the Year Award in 2000 from the Science Writers & Communicators of Canada, the Certificate of Merit from the U.S. Department of Agriculture in 2006, and the Distinguished Lecturer Award from the U.S. Environmental Protection Agency in 2001.

== Publications ==
McHughen is the author of numerous peer-reviewed research articles, academic papers, and contributor to text books on the issue of genetically modified crops. Significant authored books include:

- McHughen, Alan (19 May 2020). DNA Demystified: Unravelling the Double Helix. London: Oxford University Press. p. 392. ISBN 0190092963.
- McHughen, Alan (26 March 2002). Transgenic Plants and Crops 1st Edition. Boca Raton: CRC Press. p. 888. ISBN 0824705459.
- McHughen, Alan (22 June 2000). Pandora's Picnic Basket: The Potential and Hazards of Genetically Modified Foods. London: Oxford University Press. p. 288. ISBN 0198506740.
- McHughen, Alan (1 January 2000). A Consumer's Guide to GM Food. London: Oxford University Press. p. 211. ISBN 9780198507147.
