= Labdoor =

Dietary supplement evaluation company

Labdoor, Inc.
- Type: Private
- Industry: Product testing
- Founder: Neil Thanedar, Rafael Ferreira, Helton Souza, Tercio Junker
- Headquarters: South San Francisco, California, United States
- Services: Publisher of test results and guides for dietary supplements
- Website: Official website

Labdoor is a privately held medical company registered in San Francisco, California, founded in May 2012 by Neil Thanedar. It provides information on dietary supplements, which do not require testing by the FDA in the United States.

== History ==
Neil Thanedar co-founder of Avomeen Analytical Services, founded Labdoor (originally "Labrdr Inc") in May 2012 with co-founders Rafael Ferreira, Helton Souza, and Tercio Junker.

Labdoor pursued venture investors in 2012, 2015, and 2016, ultimately securing approximately $11 Million from groups including Y Combinator, Floodgate Fund, and Rock Health. A controlling share of Avomeen Analytical Services was sold to an investment group in 2016.

== Products and services ==
Since November 2013, Labdoor's primary income is affiliate marketing for retailers, such as Amazon, of products they have tested and certified. Labdoor also offers testing services to supplement manufacturers, assessing "accuracy", "purity", and "sport". If a product passes testing, Labdoor will also "drive sales" through its certification program and retailer referrals.

In June 2018, Labdoor launched the crypto-currency TEST. It seeks to create a incentive system for individuals or organizations to anonymously create or raise a bounty on a product for independent laboratories to test. TEST will be in initial coin offering (ICO) stage through December 2018.

Labdoor buys dietary supplements directly from retailers, sends the products to an FDA-registered laboratory for analysis, and publishes the findings. Its mission is to share information to help consumers make the right decisions for themselves about dietary supplements. Labdoor's rankings have sometimes been published by the press and online media.

== Government and legal interactions ==
Their findings resulted in the FDA taking a closer look at the safety of energy drinks. Labdoor evaluated Alex Jones's supplements, stating "the science behind many of their claimed ingredients are questionable." Some 2015 tests of supplement products conducted by a third-party laboratory, which was organized by Labdoor and the Canadian Broadcasting Corporation (CBC) program Marketplace were first published and later retracted upon repeat testing. The supplements were correctly labeled and there was no contamination nor deficiency in the products.

As of August 2016, Labdoor allows manufacturers to challenge a report of a product by re-testing the product, or opt-out of having any reports of the manufacturer's products published on Labdoor's website.

== See also ==
- Dietary supplement
- Examine.com
- Natural Standard
- ConsumerLab.com
