= Kamal Patel (researcher) =

Nutrition researcher and entrepreneur

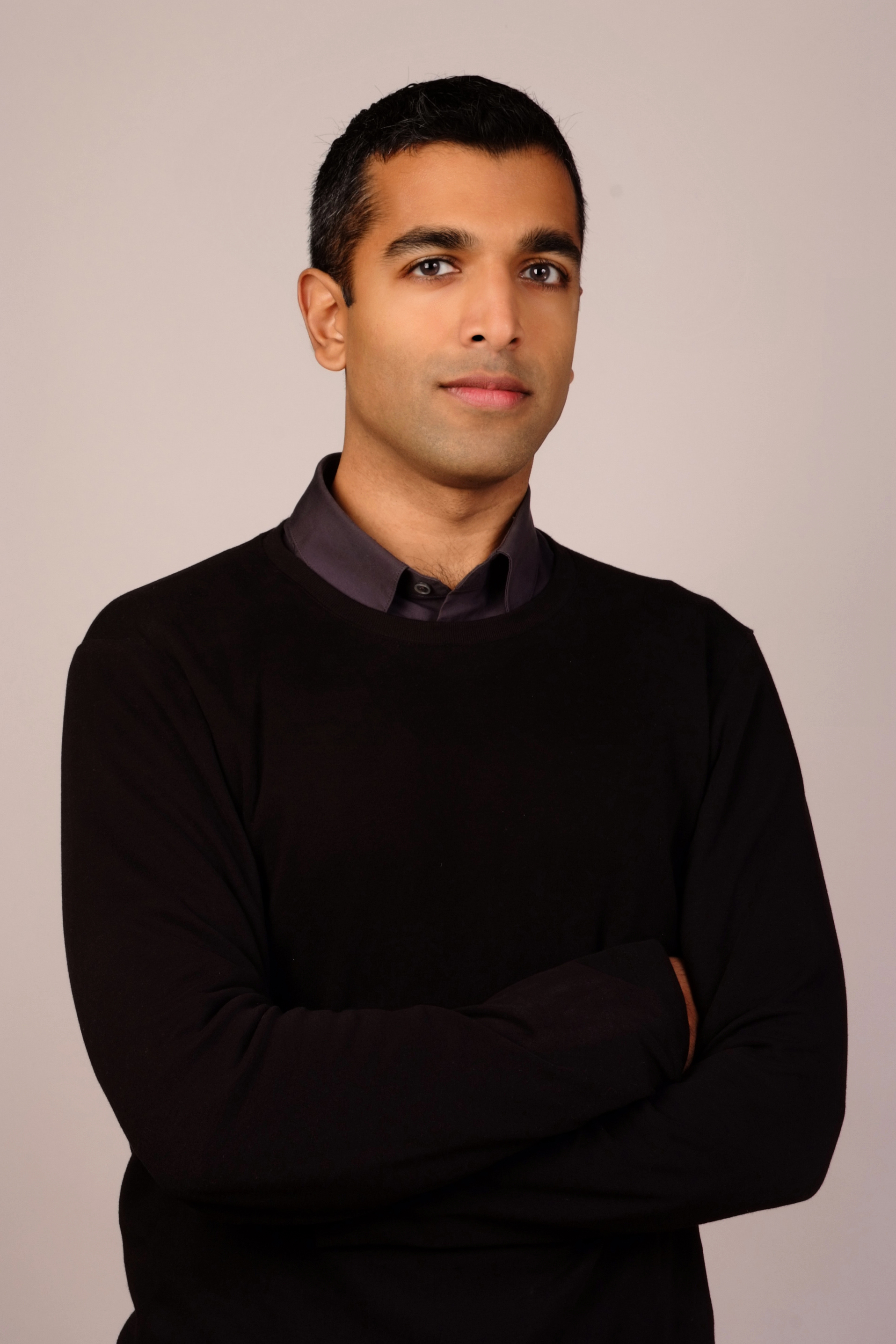
- Education: Northwestern University
- Occupations: Researcher, Nutrition Editor
- Known for: Nutrition, Dietary supplements, Vitamin D guidelines
- Website: www.examine.com

Kamal Patel is a nutrition researcher and the director of Examine.com. Alongside co-founder Sol Orwell, he grew the Examine.com compendium of clinical trials on nutrition and supplements, with the goal of creating the “largest database” of supplements on the Internet. In 2020, Patel was named #1 Most Influential Man in Health & Fitness by Men's Health UK.

== Education ==
Patel attended Northwestern University, studying economics and communications while also organizing strongman contests. He attended graduate school at Johns Hopkins University and Tufts University, studying public health, business, and nutrition.

== Career ==
Patel was a co-author on systematic reviews used to inform the Institute of Medicine 2010 vitamin D guidelines, which served as a basis for revised vitamin D guidelines in countries around the world. During that time, he was also a primary reviewer for Clinicaltrials.gov with a focus on clinical trial methodology.

Patel has also published research on genetic tests for cancer, prostate cancer treatments, fructose and liver health, self-measured monitoring of blood pressure for hypertension, and other clinical and methodological topics.

Patel has worked as a researcher at a federally-designated evidence-based practice center in meta-analysis and evidence synthesis and served as program chair for the 2013 Ancestral Health Symposium. He is a nutrition editor for the Journal of Evolution and Health.

Patel is the director of Examine.com, coordinating the team of researchers and scientists in analyzing primary research on nutrients and supplements. Under Patel, the website has expanded from a focus on supplements and athletic performance to direct analysis of research studies. In 2020, Patel was named #1 Most Influential Man in Health & Fitness by Men's Health UK.
