= Bradley Inman =

American entrepreneur and author

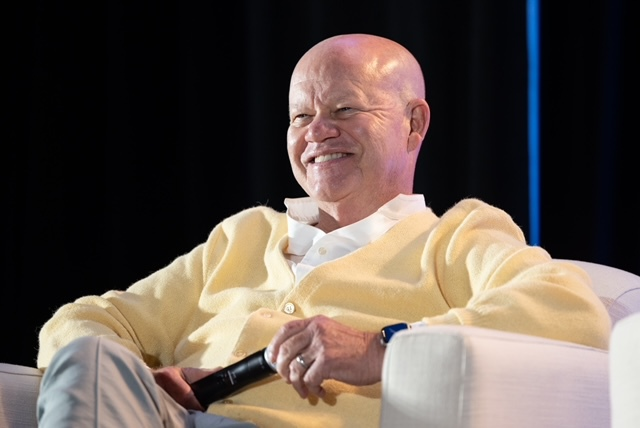
- Inman in 2024
- Education: Boston University
- Occupation: Businessman
- Years active: 1980–present

Bradley Inman (also known as Brad Inman) is an American journalist, publisher, author, and entrepreneur. He is the founder of Inman News, a publication covering the real-estate industry, and has founded or invested in technology and media companies. His career has included journalism, real-estate information services, online video, digital publishing, climate-risk data, and longevity media.

== Biography ==
Inman was born in Carlinville, Illinois. He earned bachelor's degrees, including a degree in sociology from Boston University.

He later became a visiting fellow at the University of California, Berkeley, including at the Haas School of Business and the Graduate School of Journalism.

His career began in journalism, writing a sports column in high school and later covering urban housing issues in San Francisco, which led to a 16-year column for the San Francisco Examiner. Inman later collected a number of these articles into a book, California Real Estate: the 1980s & 1990s. Inman later wrote the syndicated column California Trends, which was carried by more than 100 newspapers.

== Career ==
=== Journalism and Inman news ===
In 1996, Inman founded Inman News, an online publication covering the real-estate industry and the use of the Internet in property transactions. The publication developed from his earlier newspaper work and covered real-estate technology, brokerage, housing markets, and industry practices. Its initial coverage focused on the growing use of the Internet in real-estate transactions..

His publication later established a conference business under the name Inman Connect. His events brought together real-estate agents, brokers, technology companies, publishers, and other industry participants to discuss developments in the real-estate business.

In 2021, Inman sold Inman News to Beringer Capital, a Toronto-based private-equity firm. Following the sale, he retained a minority ownership interest and a seat on the company's board.

He was on the Microsoft team that launched HomeAdvisor in 1998. He founded online real estate firm HomeGain.com in 1999, which was acquired by Classified Ventures in 2005.

=== HomeGain ===
In 1999, Inman founded HomeGain, an online real-estate company designed to connect consumers with real-estate professionals and provide information about property values and home transactions.

HomeGain was sold to Classified Ventures in 2005. At the time of the acquisition, the company was based in Emeryville, California, and operated as an online lead-generation and marketing service for real-estate agents.

The company was subsequently acquired by Reply.com in 2013. Inman remained associated with the company as its founder, although he was no longer its owner following the 2005 sale.

=== TurnHere ===
In 2005, Inman founded TurnHere, an online video production and distribution company. The company developed a model for producing short-form video content through distributed production teams and freelance filmmakers. Its work included editorial and advertising material for businesses and media organizations.

TurnHere produced material for companies and organizations including Condé Nast, NBC, Williams-Sonoma, Yelp, and OpenTable. Its videos were also used for tourism, hospitality, and commercial marketing.

=== Vook ===
Inman established digital publishing company Vook in 2008 that was intended to combine written content with professionally produced video in a single digital publication. Inman served as its founder and chief executive officer. The company produced enhanced digital books using material from writers and video produced through TurnHere's production network. Among its projects were multimedia editions that incorporated text, video, and other digital material. In January 2010, Vook secured $2.5 million in seed funding from investors including Ron Conway, Michael Maples, and Kenneth Lerer. In December of that year, it raised a further $5.25 million in Series A funding, with participation from VantagePoint Venture Partners and FLOODGATE.

=== Investments ===
Inman has invested in and served on the boards of technology and media companies. He was an early investor in Curbed, a digital publication founded by Lockhart Steele in 2004, and served as its chairman. Curbed covered real estate, architecture, neighbourhoods, food, and retail. It later expanded into a network of publications covering these subjects. Vox Media acquired Curbed in 2013 in a transaction reportedly valued at $20 million to $30 million.

Inman was also an investor in ClimateCheck, a company providing property-level information on climate risks, including flooding, storms, wildfires, heat, and drought. The company was led by his son, Cal Inman, who served as its chief executive officer.

=== Livelong Media ===
Following the sale of Inman News, Inman founded Livelong Media, a media and events company covering longevity, health, aging and preventive medicine. The company publishes articles, newsletters, podcasts and videos and organizes events featuring researchers and healthcare professionals. Inman has written about preventive medicine, medical technology, longevity research and health testing.

== Writing and public commentary ==
Inman's writing focuses on real estate, technology, entrepreneurship, and changes in the media industry. His writing has appeared through Inman News.

His journalism has also addressed housing policy and development. In his earlier newspaper work, he wrote about affordable housing, second units, Section 8 housing, land-use disputes, and conflicts between development and environmental concerns. He later connected those subjects to technological and economic changes affecting the real-estate industry.

In 2020, Inman published California Real Estate: the 1980s & 1990s, a compilation of his reporting and writing about the California real-estate market.

== Other activities ==
He has been a visiting fellow and lecturer at the University of California, Berkeley, including its journalism and business schools.

In 2018, he was invited to speak at a Federal Trade Commission and Department of Justice workshop examining competition in the residential real-estate brokerage industry.
