= Orwell (surname) =

Orwell is a surname, and may refer to:

- George Orwell, pseudonym of Eric Arthur Blair (1903–1950), English novelist, essayist and journalist
- Sol Orwell (born Ahmed Farooq), Pakistani entrepreneur and business developer
- Sonia Orwell (Sonia Mary Brownell) (1918–1980), second wife of George Orwell
