= Taylor Wallace =

American food scientist and nutritionist

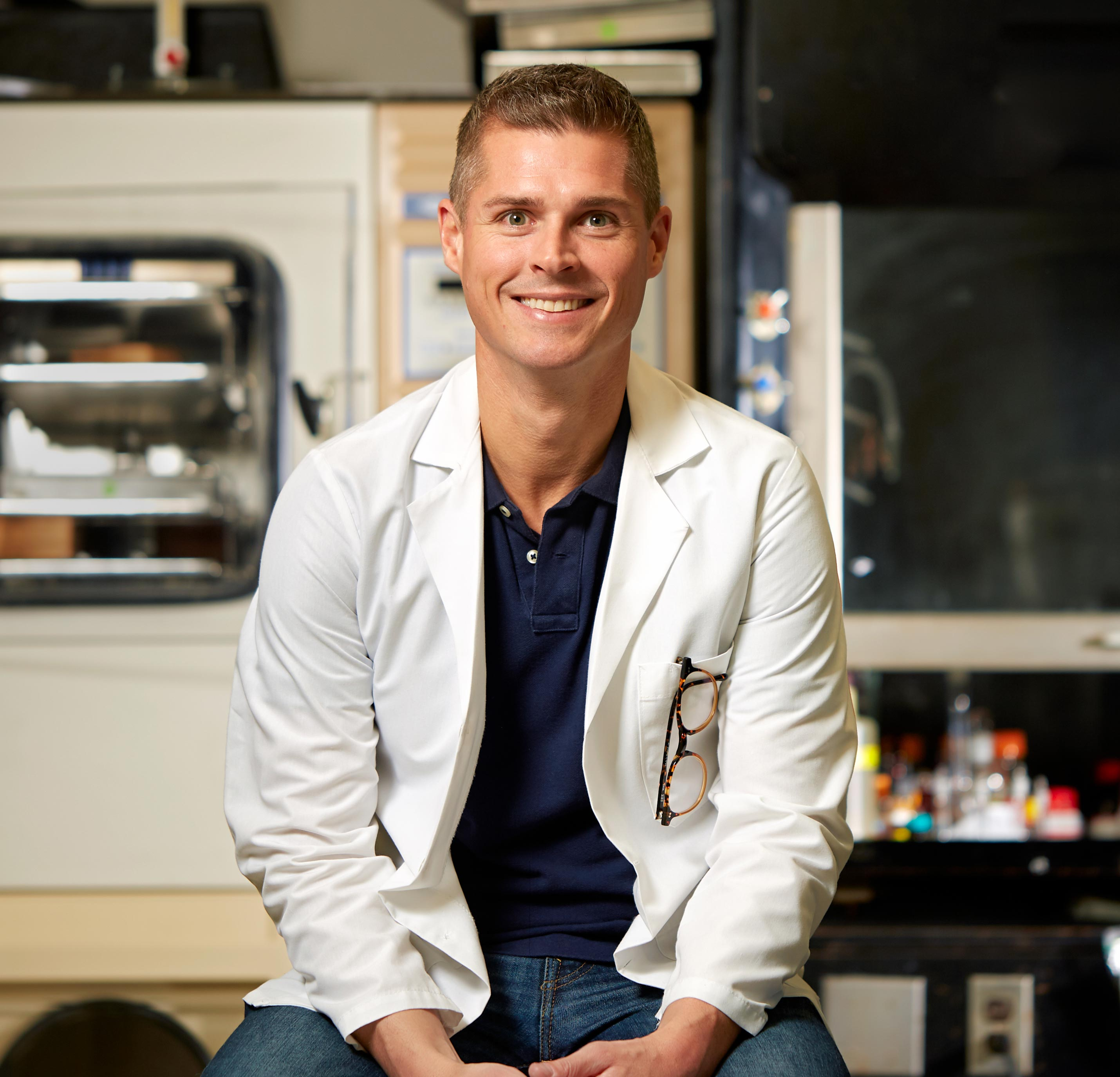
- Education: Ohio State University; University of Kentucky
- Occupations: Author, food and nutrition scientist, media personality

Taylor C. Wallace is an American food and nutrition scientist and media personality. Wallace is the principal consultant at the Think Healthy Group, an adjunct clinical associate professor in the School of Medicine and Health Sciences at George Washington University, and an adjunct associate professor in the Gerald J. And Dorothy R. Friedman School of Nutrition Science and Policy at Tufts University. Wallace has previously served in senior staff positions at The National Osteoporosis Foundation, and Council for Responsible Nutrition. He serves as the Editor-in-chief of the Journal of Dietary Supplements and has authored over 100 research studies.

== Career ==
Wallace received his PhD and MS in Food Science and Nutrition from Ohio State University and a BS in Food Science and Technology from the University of Kentucky.

In 2011, Wallace was appointed senior director of scientific and regulatory affairs at the Council for Responsible Nutrition, succeeding Andrew Shao. Prior to this, he had served as scientific communications program manager at the International Life Sciences Institute, North America.

In 2013, the National Osteoporosis Foundation (NOF) hired Wallace as senior director of science, policy, and government affairs. In the same year, he also served as senior director of scientific and clinical programs at the National Bone Health Alliance, a public-private partnership operated by the NOF. Additionally, the Department of Nutrition and Food Studies at George Mason University hired Wallace as an adjunct professor.

In 2015, the American Nutrition Association awarded Wallace with the Charles E. Ragus Award for his research and innovation in the field of nutrition science.

In 2016, Wallace founded Think Healthy Group, a food science and nutrition firm.

In 2017, Wallace was appointed Senior Fellow at the Center for Magnesium Research and Education.

Wallace is currently the Chief Food and Nutrition Scientist for the Produce for Better Health Foundation.

Wallace is a former Trustee and Treasurer of Feeding Tomorrow, the Foundation of the Institute of Food Technologists. He is a fellow of the American College of Nutrition, the Deputy Editor-in-Chief for the Journal of the American Nutrition Association. His other editorial board work includes serving as Editor-in-Chief of the Journal of Dietary Supplements and as Nutrition Section Editor of the Annals of Medicine.

== Books and publications ==
=== Text books ===
- Johnson J, Wallace T (2009). Whole Grains and their Bioactives: Composition and Health. Wiley. doi:10.1002/9781119129486. ISBN 978-1-119-12945-5. S2CID 109297317.
- Wallace TC, ed. (2018). Dietary Bioactives and Bone Health. Switzerland: MDPI AG. ISBN 978-3038428459.
- Giusti MM, Wallace TC (2018). Health-Promoting Components of Fruits and Vegetables in Human Health. Switzerland: MDPI AG. ISBN 978-3038426288.
- Wallace TC, ed. (2014). Dietary Supplements in Health Promotion. New York, NY: CRC Press. ISBN 978-1482210347.
- Wallace TC, MacKay D, Al-Mondhiry R, Nguyen H, Griffiths J (2014). Wallace TC, MacKay D, Al-Mondhiry R, Nguyen H, Griffiths J (eds.). Dietary Supplement Regulations in the U.S. SpringerBriefs in Food, Health, and Nutrition. Cham, Switzerland: Springer International Publishing. doi:10.1007/978-3-319-01502-6. ISBN 978-3-319-01501-9. S2CID 199491150.
- Wallace TC, Giusti MM (2013). Anthocyanins in Health and Disease Prevention. New York, NY: CRC Press. ISBN 978-1439894712.
- Wallace TC, ed (2023). Health Professional's Guide to Dietary Supplements. Academy of Nutrition and Dietetics. ISBN 978-0-88091-204-4.
