= Michael Maples =

Michael Maples could refer to:

- Mike Maples, Sr. (born 1942), American businessman and Microsoft executive.
- Michael D. Maples (born 1949), United States Army General
- Michael Maples (racing driver) (born 1963), American racing driver
- Mike Maples Jr., co-founder of the Floodgate Fund
