= Journal of Dietary Supplements =

- Discipline: Dietary supplements
- Language: English
- Edited by: Taylor C. Wallace

Publication details
- Former names: Journal of Nutraceuticals, Functional & Medical Foods
- History: 1996–present
- Publisher: Taylor & Francis
- Frequency: Quarterly

Standard abbreviations
- ISO 4: J. Diet. Suppl.

Indexing
- ISSN: 1939-0211 (print); 1939-022X (web)
- OCLC no.: 154220182

Links
- Journal homepage

The Journal of Dietary Supplements is a quarterly peer-reviewed scientific journal that covers research in any area involving dietary supplements. It is abstracted and indexed in CABI, Academic Search Complete, Biological Abstracts, PubMed/MEDLINE, EMBASE, BIOSIS Previews, and the Emerging Sources Citation Index. The journal was established in 1996 as the Journal of Nutraceuticals, Functional & Medical Foods and was published by Haworth Press. It changed to its present title in 2004 and has been published since 2008 by Taylor & Francis.

== Editors-in-chief ==
The following persons are or have been Editor-in-chief:

- 1996-2004: Nancy M. Childs
- 2005-2006: Shawn M. Talbott
- 2007-2018: Catherine Ulbricht
- 2018-present: Taylor C. Wallace
