= Creatorverse =

2014 video game

Creatorverse was a 2D physics-based sandbox creation game for Apple iOS, Android, Amazon Fire, and Fire HD that was released in November 2012. The product was discontinued in February 2014.

Creatorverse gained notoriety in the gaming press as the first tablet app released by San Francisco-based Linden Lab, which had previously been known primarily as the creator of the online virtual world Second Life. The product continued the company’s positioning as a maker of “shared creative spaces” that favor open-ended content creation and sharing over traditional goal-oriented gaming.

== Creation ==
Creatorverse was primarily focused on creativity and building. The creator uses the tablet’s touch screen to create designs that could then be animated and set into motion using various physics-based properties and attributes (such as friction, speed and force). All creations can then be shared among other creators, who also have the capability to remix, expand or even dismantle other community creations.

Inspiration for Creatorverse, including the logo, originated from the popular device Newton's cradle, which demonstrates conservation of momentum and energy via a series of swinging spheres.
