= Examine.com =

Canadian online encyclopedia company

- Website type: Wiki, database
- Available in: English
- Creators: Sol Orwell, Kamal Patel, Kurtis Frank
- Industry: Nutrition, Supplements
- Website: Examine.com
- Launched: 2011
- Current status: active

Examine.com is a Toronto-based company that runs an online encyclopedia covering health, nutrition and supplementation. The website collates scientific research using evidence-based practice methodology. Examine.com is led by Kamal Patel, and includes scientists, editors and peer reviewers.

== History ==
Examine.com was created in 2011 by University of Toronto alumnus Sol Orwell out of his frustration with users on Reddit asking the same questions over and over again. Kurtis Frank had posted on a public forum that he had been doing nutrition research, and wanted to improve accessibility to such information. He was contacted by Orwell, and they created the website, with Frank becoming co-founder. Orwell had already thought of the idea from his weight loss journey and frustration with info on supplements, but wanted an expert alongside. Frank left Examine sometime in 2018, when his name was removed from the site.

The company began with a focus on supplementation research, but expanded into nutrition as it continued to grow. During the initial research that led to the company's founding, Orwell noticed unsourced and incorrect marketing claims about nutrition and supplementation made it difficult to draw conclusions about health, which lead to the site's standard of evidence-based analysis. In 2014, the company began directly reviewing nutrition research in a digest tailored to the "serious enthusiast or professional".

Men's Fitness named Orwell a 2014 Game Changer for his work on Examine.com and for providing "hype-free, science-sourced information relatable to the masses."

In 2015, Forbes interviewed Orwell about his "seven-figure business", and Fast Company included Examine.com as one of the top ten innovative companies in fitness. The company was incorporated in 2015, with Kamal Patel officially joining as co-founder.

As of September 2016, the website said that it had over 50,000 references.

By 2020, the website was being used by mainstream media such as The New York Times as a supplements reference in the context of strength-building advice and understanding the role of supplements during the COVID-19 pandemic. The same year, inspired by GiveWell, Examine.com started publicly disclosing the mistakes they had committed and how they were fixing them.

In 2020, Examine.com Director Kamal Patel was named #1 Most Influential Man in Health & Fitness by Men's Health UK.

== Company structure ==
Remaining unbiased is named as a priority in the site's mission statement. Examine.com only reviews research and supplement ingredients, rather than specific products. On the company blog, Examine.com publishes rebuttals to cases of exaggerated marketing of nutrition and supplementation products.

== See also ==
- Natural Standard
- Dietary supplement
- Media transparency
- Comparison of supplements by different brands:
  - ConsumerLab.com
  - Labdoor, Inc
