= 1-Page =

Defunct software company

- Type: Public company
- Traded as: ASX: 1PG
- Industry: HR Tech
- Founded: November 2011
- Defunct: March 2017
- Headquarters: Perth, Western Australia
- Key people: Peter Kent (CEO), Joanna Riley (President, Founder and Executive Director)
- Products: 1-Page SOURCE - Talent Sourcing Platform; 1-Page Assessment Platform

1-Page (ASX: 1PG) was a company that developed and marketed software products for human resources departments to support them in sourcing and qualifying job candidates, as well as in engaging their current workforce. 1-Page Limited is the first Silicon Valley company to list on the Australian Securities Exchange (ASX). San Francisco–based, 1-Page was founded in 2011, and received its first venture capital funding in 2012. Before going public on the ASX in October 2014, the company had raised USD 3 million in venture capital funds.

Since the public offering, the company lost more than 96% of its value, slipping to less than 20¢ AUD per share. The Motley Fool described the crash as "what happens when companies spend heavily and can't generate sales."

== History ==
In 2002, Patrick G. Riley published The One-Page Proposal which described how the founder succeeded in helping businesses around the world using one-page proposals. In 2011, Patrick G. Riley and Joanna Weidenmiller co-founded 1-Page based on the approach and founding principles of the book.

Between 2012 and 2013 the company raised $3 million from Silicon Valley–based venture capital funds led by Blumberg Capital as well as Angel investors. In April 2014 the company completed a successful reverse take-over of ASX-listed Intermet Resources, which led to the public listing of 1-Page on the ASX on 15 October. During the IPO roadshow 1-Page raised $8.5M. The company’s shares surged 70 per cent on its first day of trade as investors flocked to the first US tech start-up to list on the ASX. It was delisted from the ASX in September 2018.

== Products ==
1-Page’s first launched product was an enterprise assessment platform that enables companies to engage candidates on real-time business challenges to assess their skills.

Other 1-Page products are:

- 1-Page Source, a talent sourcing tool that leverages the 820 million profiles of BranchOut alongside other open web data to automate talent list building and verification for recruiters.
- 1-Page Innovation, a platform that enables companies to source ideas from within the organization.

== Acquisition ==
One month after going public, 1-Page announced its first acquisition. The company acquired the professional networking service built on the Facebook platform BranchOut. BranchOut picked up millions of users and $49M in funding on the back of that growth but then the app died when Facebook changed its policies on how apps could make their growth go viral. As part of the deal, 1-Page says it is buying this app and will use it “to create the most powerful employee referral engine for enterprises globally”.
