= Patterns (video game) =

- Developers: Linden Lab, Free Range Games
- Publisher: Linden Lab
- Platforms: Microsoft Windows, macOS
- Mode: Single-player

Patterns was a sandbox-style building game published by San Francisco-based Linden Lab, which had previously been known primarily as the creator of the online virtual world Second Life. The PC product, which was distributed via BuildPatterns.com, continues the company’s positioning as a maker of "shared creative spaces" that favor open-ended content creation and sharing over traditional goal-oriented gaming.

== Gameplay ==
From its debut in 2012, Patterns drew comparisons to games with blocks among the media and industry observers, with GameSpy's Mike Sharkey calling the game "Minecraft, but with triangles instead of blocks".

As with most games that include blocks, creators were encouraged to explore and build in an expansive open-space environment. Creators could construct simple or elaborate structures using various shapes and patterns that are discovered as the game progresses. Critics noted that a distinct difference from games like Minecraft was that creations in Patterns were subject to the laws of gravity, which could impact the strength and durability of each creation. Creators also had to consider how to best strategically choose each building substance, since they contained different physical properties.

== Cancellation ==
On October 10, 2014, Linden Lab announced that they were abandoning development of Patterns and shutting down the servers. The game was subsequently pulled from sale on Steam.
