= Catherine Ulbricht =

American pharmacist

- Education: Massachusetts College of Pharmacy and Health Sciences, University of Connecticut, Northeastern University
- Known for: Founder of Natural Standard Research Collaboration
- Scientific career
- Institutions: Massachusetts General Hospital

Catherine (Kate) Elizabeth Ulbricht is a co-founder of the Natural Standard Research Collaboration. She is a Senior Attending Pharmacist at Massachusetts General Hospital. She serves on the editorial board of Harvard Health Publications, the Journal of the American Nutraceutical Association, and Pharmacy Practice News. She is editor in chief of the Journal of Dietary Supplements.

== Academic career ==
- Senior Attending Pharmacist, Massachusetts General Hospital
- Adjunct Assistant Professor, Department of Pharmacy Practice, School of Pharmacy, Massachusetts College of Pharmacy and Health Sciences
- Assistant Clinical Professor, School of Pharmacy, Bouve College of Health Sciences, Northeastern University
- Assistant Clinical Professor, University of Rhode Island School of Pharmacy
- Assistant Clinical Professor, University of Florida College of Pharmacy

== Books ==
- Ulbricht, Catherine E. Davis's Pocket Guide to Herbs and Supplements. Philadelphia, PA: F.A. Davis Company, 2011.
- Ulbricht, Catherine E. Natural Standard Herb & Supplement Guide: An Evidence-Based Reference. Maryland Heights, Mo: Elsevier/Mosby, 2010.
- Ulbricht, Catherine E. Natural Standard Medical Conditions Reference: An Integrative Approach. St. Louis, Mo: Mosby/Elsevier, 2009.
- Ulbricht, Catherine E., and Erica Seamon. Natural Standard Herbal Pharmacotherapy: An Evidence-Based Approach. St. Louis, Mo: Elsevier Mosby, 2009.
- Basch, Ethan M., and Catherine E. Ulbricht. Natural Standard Herb & Supplement Handbook: The Clinical Bottom Line. St. Louis, Mo: Elsevier Mosby, 2005.
- Ulbricht, Catherine E., and Ethan M. Basch. Natural Standard Herb & Supplement Reference: Evidence-Based Clinical Reviews (English, Japanese). St. Louis, MO: Elsevier Mosby, 2005.
- Ulbricht, Catherine E., and Erica Rusie-Seamon. Common "Complementary and Alternative Medicine Health Systems." Handbook of Nonprescription Drugs: An Interactive Approach to Self-Care. Ed. Rosemary R. Berardi. Washington, D.C.: American Pharmacists Association, 2009.
- Basch, Ethan M., Ulbricht, Catherine E., Cohen, Lorenzo, and Moshe A. Frenkel. "Complementary, Alternative, and Integrative Therapies." DeVita, Hellman, and Rosenberg's Cancer: Principles & Practice of Oncology. Ed. DeVita, Vincent T., Theodore S. Lawrence, and Steven A. Rosenberg. Philadelphia: Wolters Kluwer/Lippincott Williams & Wilkins, 2008.
- Ulbricht, Catherine E. "Biological Agents." Integrative Medicine for Children. Ed. May Loo. St. Louis, Mo: Saunders/Elsevier, 2009.
