= Quick (newspaper) =

- Quick logo
- Type: Weekly newspaper (free)
- Format: Compact/Tabloid
- Owner: A. H. Belo
- Publisher: Tracy Martin-Taylor
- Editor: Rob Clark
- Founded: 2003
- Headquarters: 508 Young St. Dallas, TX 75202; United States
- Website: QuickDFW.com

Quick was a Dallas-Fort Worth area free weekly newspaper published from 2003 to 2011. As the name implies, it was delivered in a quick-to-read format: a tabloid ranging in page count from 20 to 40. It was available free each week on Thursdays from street teams and courtesy news racks at Dallas Area Rapid Transit (DART) rail stations, office buildings, and other busy locations throughout the Dallas area.

Initially, Quick was a free daily paper that contained "quick hits" of the daily top news stories, weather and sports. However, after declining readership and distribution issues began to plague the paper, it switched to a once-a-week format that highlighted entertainment and lifestyle offerings in the Dallas-Fort Worth Metroplex such as music, movies and local dining aimed at the 18 to 40 age demographic. It was considered a direct competitor of another local entertainment/lifestyle guide, the Dallas Observer.

Dallas Morning News officials announced on July 27, 2011, that Quick would cease publication with its August 4, 2011, issue. The publisher said it ended publication because the eight-year venture was ultimately unprofitable. Nine employees, including two part-timers, were laid off as a result.
