= American Nutrition Association =

Non-profit organization

- Abbreviation: ANA
- Formation: 1959
- Headquarters: 211 West Chicago Avenue, Suite 217, Hinsdale, Illinois 60521
- Website: https://theana.org/

The American Nutrition Association (ANA) is a 501(c)(3) charitable non-profit organization established to encourage the scientific investigation of nutrition and metabolism. The ANA publishes the Journal of the American Nutrition Association and hosts scientific conferences in the U.S. and in Europe. It is headquartered in Hinsdale, Illinois.

Previously known as the American College of Nutrition, in 2019 together with the Board for Certification of Nutrition Specialists, the Center for Nutrition Advocacy, and the American Nutrition Association Foundation, affiliated together as the American Nutrition Association. The four organizations remain legally independent entities but share a single website together.

== History ==
The American College of Nutrition was founded in 1959 with the stated purpose of enhancing nutrition and metabolism knowledge among physicians and professionals from all disciplines with a common interest in nutrition, and to promote the application of such knowledge to the maintenance of health and treatment of disease.

=== Merge proposal ===
In October 2010, the American College of Nutrition and American Society for Nutrition proposed to merge.

== Structure ==
The ANA is governed by a member-elected Board of Directors and the current CEO of ANA is Michael Stroka. The organization also has several advisory components which include a Scientific Advisory Board, Strategic Advisory Board, Ketogenic Nutrition Training Program Development Team, and a Nutritional Genomics Advisory Panel.

=== European Chapter ===
The European chapter of the American Nutrition Association was established in 2001. In 2011 the ANA said that its European chapter had hosted eight scientific conferences.

== Membership ==
Members of the American Nutrition Association are clinicians, researchers and academicians, medical students, and international nutritionists. Categories of membership include Professional Member, Student Member, Professional Associate, and Nutrition Enthusiast.

== Publications ==
Journal of the American Nutrition Association
- Discipline: Nutrition
- Language: English
- Edited by: Rachel Kopec, PhD, Ohio State University

Publication details
- Former name: Journal of the American College of Nutrition
- Publisher: Journal of the American Nutrition Association
- Impact factor: 3.571 (2021)

Standard abbreviations
- ISO 4: J. Am. Nutr. Assoc.

Indexing
- ISSN: 2769-7061 (print); 2769-707X (web)
- OCLC no.: 1266211146

Links
- Journal homepage

The Journal of the American Nutrition Association (JANA) is a peer-reviewed journal published eight times a year by ANA. It has an impact factor of 3.571 as of 2021. The JANA includes:

- Original and innovative research in nutrition with useful application for researchers, physicians, and other healthcare professionals
- Critical reviews on pertinent nutrition topics that highlight key teaching points and relevance to nutrition
- Letters to the editors and commentaries on important issues in the field of nutrition
- Abstracts on nutritional topics with editorial comments
- Book reviews
- Abstracts from the annual meeting of the American Nutrition Association (in the October issue)

The JANA is abstracted or indexed in Current Contents, Index Medicus, MEDLINE, Science Citation Index, SciSearch, Research Alert, Chemical Abstracts, CAB International and BIOSIS.

As of 2022 Taylor Wallace was on the editorial board

=== Failure to disclose ties ===
According to the Integrity in Science project, the Journal of the American College of Nutrition, now the Journal of the American Nutrition Association, failed to disclose the ties of the editor and authors of their June 2006 supplement on sodium to the food industry. The Editor in Chief subsequently published a letter in the journal noting the ambiguity in the conflict of interest disclosure process then in place and a new documentation procedure was put in place to remedy this.

== Activities ==
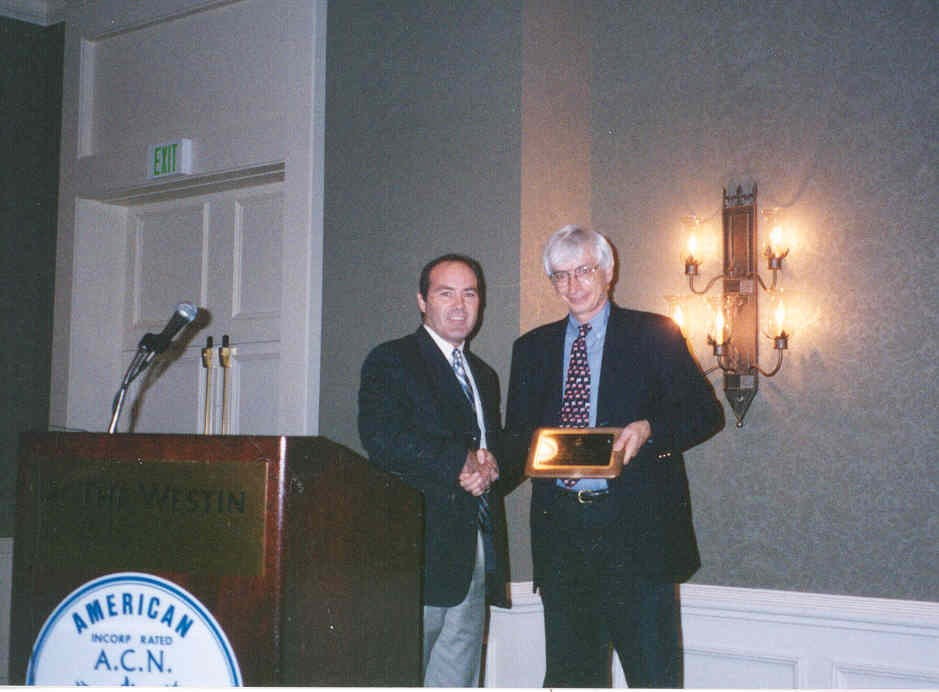
Annual conference in 2002

=== Annual Nutrition Science Conferences ===
Through 2021 the organization had held 62 annual scientific conferences.

=== Corporate funding ===
The organization accepted funding from for-profit corporations until 2011. In 2011 the policy was updated:

"The American College of Nutrition accepts no funding from for-profit corporations. This policy fosters our mission and our ability to advance unbiased science without compromise."

== See also ==
- American Dietetic Association
- National Board of Physician Nutrition Specialists
