= Oswell (given name) =

Oswell is a given name. Notable people with the name include:

- Oswell Blakeston, pseudonym of Henry Joseph Hasslacher (1907–1985), British writer and artist
- Oswell Borradaile (1859–1935), English cricketer
