= Classified Ventures =

Chicago-based digital media company

Classified Ventures, LLC
- Type: Joint venture
- Industry: Advertising
- Defunct: October 1, 2014
- Fate: Acquired by Gannett Company
- Headquarters: Chicago, Illinois, United States
- Owners: Central Newspapers; A. H. Belo Corporation; Gannett Company; The McClatchy Company; Tribune Company; Graham Holdings Company

Classified Ventures, LLC was a Chicago-based digital media company. The company was established to capitalize on the revenue growth opportunities in the online classified advertising categories of automotive and rentals. It was a joint venture among six major newspaper publishers: Central Newspapers, A. H. Belo, Gannett Company, The McClatchy Company, Tribune Company, and Graham Holdings Company It was the owner and operator of two leading national online brands: Apartments.com and Cars.com.

In April 2014, Apartments.com and its associated sites were sold to CoStar Group for $585 million. On August 5, 2014, Gannett announced that it would buy out the other owners' 72% combined stake in Classified Ventures for $1.8 billion, valuing Cars.com at $2.5 billion. The acquisition was closed on October 1, 2014. The sale of Apartments.com and Cars.com allowed Classified Ventures to return over $3.5 billion to its owners through a combination of the sales proceeds and dividends paid to its owners in cash or in the form of below market transfer pricing for the sale of digital marketing products sold in its local affiliate newspaper markets.

Tegna, Inc., the successor to Gannett's broadcasting and digital properties, spun off Cars.com in May 2017.
