= Bragg v. Linden Research, Inc. =

2007 United States civil action

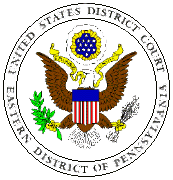
- Court: United States District Court for the Eastern District of Pennsylvania
- Decided: May 30, 2007
- Citation: 487 F. Supp. 2d 593

Holding
- An Internet company's mandatory arbitration clause is unconscionable under contract law; a plaintiff's participation in an online virtual world serves as minimum contact for jurisdiction by a local court.

Court membership
- Judge sitting: Eduardo C. Robreno

Keywords
- United States contract law, Arbitration clause, Personal jurisdiction

Bragg v. Linden Research, Inc., 487 F. Supp. 2d 593 (E.D. Pa. 2007), was a ruling at the United States District Court for the Eastern District of Pennsylvania. The case resulted in an important early ruling on the enforceability of an online End User License Agreement (EULA) under American contract law, though it did not ultimately gain influence as a precedent. The ruling also clarified the matter of personal jurisdiction for a dispute involving a user of a website that originates in a different region.

== Background ==
Linden Lab (owned by the corporate entity Linden Research, Inc.), an online virtual world service provider known for the popular Second Life world-building game, terminated the account of user Marc Bragg when it discovered that Bragg had found a way to acquire land in the virtual world at a lower-than-market price by manipulating in-game auctions. This was deemed an act of hacking that violated the Second Life End User License Agreement. Linden Lab conducted an investigation and then closed Bragg's account completely. In the process, Bragg's virtual assets within the game were dissolved; Bragg claimed that those assets were worth between US $4,000 and $6,000.

Bragg filed suit, originally at the West Chester District Court (a county court) in Pennsylvania in 2006. Linden Lab argued that the case should be removed to federal court due to the facts of the case, and claimed that courts in Pennsylvania lacked personal jurisdiction because Linden Lab was headquartered in California. Linden Lab also claimed that the dispute should not be heard in court at all but should go to arbitration, due to the arbitration clause found in the Second Life EULA. Bragg's efforts to resist the move to federal court were unsuccessful.

== District court proceedings ==
In May 2007, Judge Eduardo C. Robreno of the United States District Court for the Eastern District of Pennsylvania rejected Linden Lab's argument that his court and others in Pennsylvania lacked personal jurisdiction in the dispute, because the company had engaged in nationwide marketing efforts to publicize Second Life and the virtual world was available to customers in Pennsylvania. This satisfied the minimum contacts that are necessary for personal jurisdiction.

Having thus determined that his court had jurisdiction, Robreno then denied Linden Lab's attempt to force the dispute into arbitration, finding that the EULA containing this requirement had been constructed as a contract of adhesion for which users like Bragg were given no opportunity to negotiate. Bragg had argued that the arbitration clause in the EULA was "both procedurally and substantively unconscionable and is itself evidence of defendants' scheme to deprive Plaintiff (and others) of both their money and their day in court."

Robreno agreed, noting that the terms of service were presented by Linden Lab on a "take-it-or-leave-it-basis." However, he limited this holding by noting that a claim of unconscionability for a contract will only succeed if there are no "reasonably available market alternatives" available to the weaker party. This worked in Bragg's favor in the present case. Although there were numerous other online virtual worlds available to Bragg at the time, Judge Robreno noted that Second Life was unique in that it allowed participants to retain property rights in virtual land. Thus, the Second Life EULA was found to be unenforceable under contract law due to its unconscionable provisions.

== Impact and subsequent developments ==
Bragg and Linden Lab later reached an out of court settlement in which Bragg's full "privileges and responsibilities to the Second Life community" were restored. At the time of the district court ruling, some commentators believed that it could become an important precedent on arbitration clauses and other unconscionable provisions that are forced upon Internet users by the operators of online games and platforms. However, the ruling turned out to be an outlier because later court disputes over objectionable EULAs were almost uniformly ruled in favor of Internet firms as long as users had a chance to read the terms of service with an obvious opportunity to accept or reject the terms before continuing to use the site or software. On the other hand, the Bragg ruling is often cited in later cases involving specific disputes within virtual world platforms in which property can be bought and sold.
