= DallasNews Corporation =

Media holding company based in Texas, US

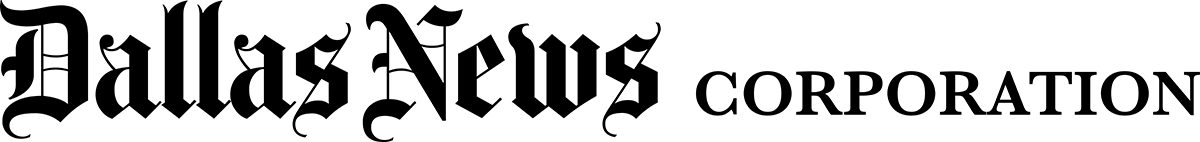

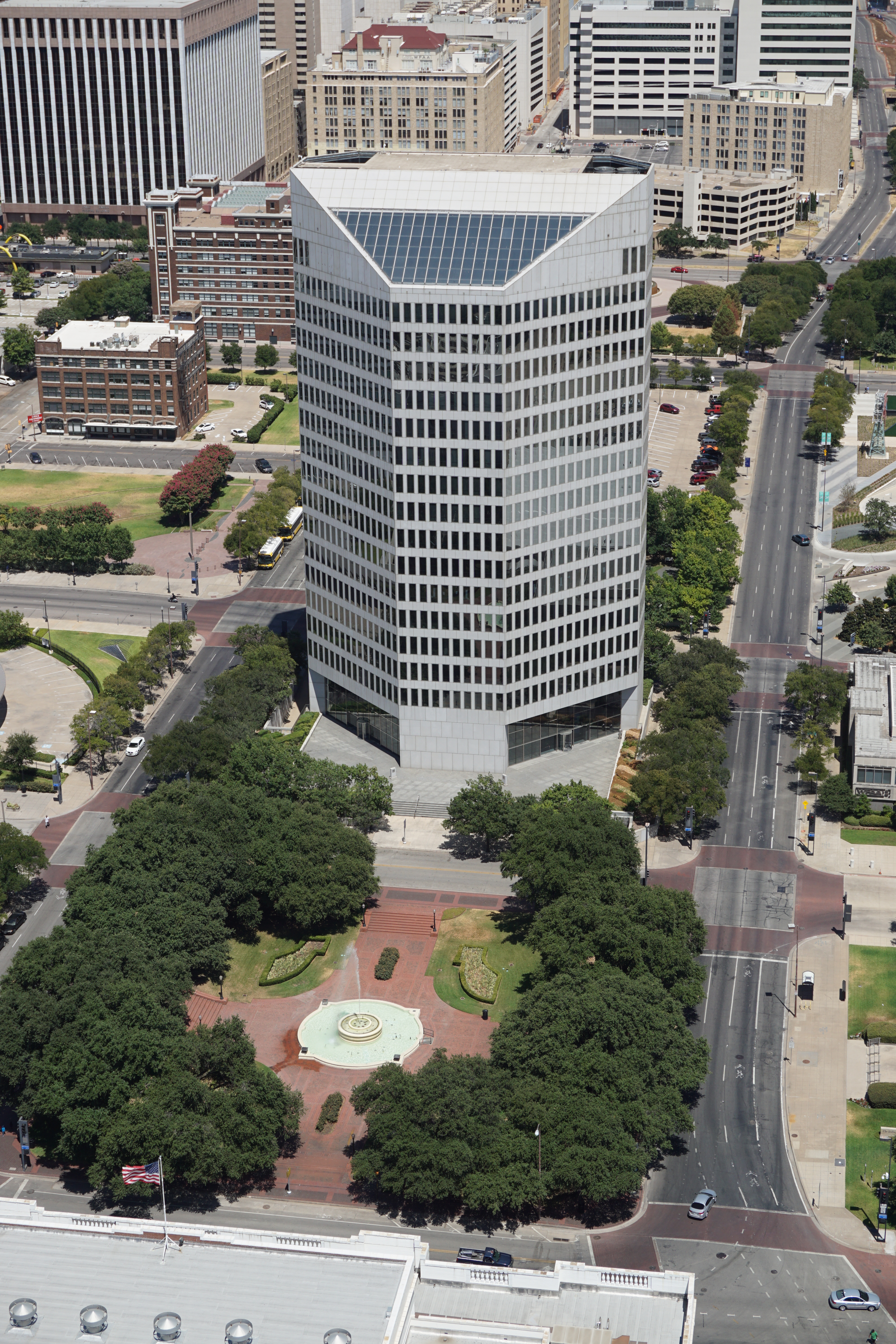
- The Belo Building (now called 400 Record) in Dallas, the previous headquarters of A. H. Belo Corporation
- Formerly: A. H. Belo Corporation
- Type: Public
- Traded as: Nasdaq: DALN
- ISIN: US0012821023
- Industry: Newspapers
- Predecessor: Belo Corporation
- Founded: 2008; 18 years ago (spun off from Belo)
- Fate: Purchased
- Successor: DallasNews Corporation subsidiary of Hearst Communications
- Headquarters: Dallas, Texas, United States
- Key people: Robert W. Decherd (chairman, president and CEO)
- Products: List of newspapers
- Revenue: ▼US$ 154.219 million (2020)
- Operating income: ▼US$ -15.573 million (2020)
- Net income: ▼US$ -6.872 million (2020)
- Total assets: ▼US$ 123.215 million (2020)
- Total equity: ▼US$ 46.408 million (2020)
- Number of employees: 439 (2025)
- Website: dallasnewscorporation.com

DallasNews Corporation, formerly A. H. Belo Corporation (/ˈbiːloʊ/), was a Dallas, Texas-based media holding company of The Dallas Morning News and Belo + Company. In 2025, it was purchased by Hearst Communications, and remains as a formal subsidiary of that company.

== Overview ==
The corporation was formed when Belo Corporation separated its broadcasting and publishing operations into two corporations (with the broadcasting division going to the "old" Belo; it was later purchased by Gannett, and its former assets are part of what is now Tegna).

Headquartered in the Belo Building in Downtown Dallas, its CEO is James Moroney III. It also owns a part interest in Classified Ventures.

== History ==
The company was organized as a fully owned subsidiary of Belo Corporation on October 1, 2007, then taken public by issuing the new stock to Belo shareholders and starting trade on February 8, 2008. The split was structured so that Belo Corporation was the legal successor of the original company.

While technically this corporate entity was formed in 2008, the organization traces its roots and history back to 1842. The Belo Corporation used the A. H. Belo name from 1926 to 2002 when it was shortened to simply Belo.

In 2016, the company announced that it is planning to leave the Belo Building for The Statler Library, also located downtown. As of 2018, the company website lists 1954 Commerce Street in Dallas as their headquarters address.

The company changed its name and ticker symbol and moved from the New York Stock Exchange to the Nasdaq on June 29, 2021, after acknowledging the history tied to their founder, A. H. Belo, a colonel in the Confederate military during the American Civil War, especially given that the company has its origins as early as 1842.

The change was proposed in 2021 by CEO Robert W. Decherd to embrace "the social justice movement underway in America." The name change was approved by company shareholders the same year, with 99% of votes cast.

In July 2025, Hearst Communications announced it had agreed to purchase DallasNews for $14 a share. The sale is expected to close at the 4th quarter of 2025. A few weeks later Alden Global Capital submitted a competing bid for $16.50 a share, which was rejected by the DallasNews board. Alden then submitted a letter threatening to take their offer directly to DallasNews shareholders.

On September 24, 2025, DallasNews Corporation announced that it had completed its merger with Hearst.

== Newspapers ==
- The Dallas Morning News (Dallas, Texas)
  - Al Día (Spanish language – Dallas, Texas)

The company also formerly published the Denton Record-Chronicle, The Providence Journal, the Riverside Press-Enterprise, Quick, a free weekly in Dallas, and The Business Press, a weekly business publication in Riverside.

For decades, News-Texan, Inc., an A.H. Belo subsidiary, was the owner of The Dallas Morning News as well as other newspapers in the suburban Dallas area. Belo acquired seven newspapers in 1963, which included The Garland Daily News, The Grand Prairie Daily News, and The Richardson Daily News. The newspaper group would become Dallas-Fort Worth Suburban Newspapers, Inc. Belo executives specifically shifted the newspapers to afternoon delivery to compete with The Dallas Times-Herald, the rival of the chain's flagship The Dallas Morning News, according to Judith Garrett Segura, author of Belo: From Newspapers to New Media. She claims the newspapers were not profitable for roughly two years. These newspapers would operate and be published relatively independently until the late 1980s. Under increased advertising pressures and laws prohibiting media monopolies in urban markets, the newspapers were ultimately absorbed into The Dallas Morning News.
