= Sansar (video game) =

Social virtual reality platform

- Developers: Linden Lab; Sansar Inc. (2020–present)
- Release: July 31, 2017; 9 years ago
- Platform: Windows
- Website: sansar.com

Sansar is a social virtual reality platform, for Microsoft Windows only, developed by the San Francisco-based firm Linden Lab, and now owned by Sansar Inc. It launched in "creator beta" to the general public on July 31, 2017. The platform enables user-created 3D spaces where people can create and share interactive social experiences, such as playing games, watching videos, and having conversations in VR. Each participant is represented by a detailed avatar that is the graphical representation of the user, including speech-driven facial animations and motion-driven body animations.

Sansar supports both virtual reality headsets (including the Oculus Rift and HTC Vive) and Windows computers, and is free to use, with advanced features available for paying subscribers.

== History ==
In 2014, Linden Lab announced its intent to develop a "next-generation virtual world" in the spirit of its virtual world Second Life.

In 2015, more details about the project became public including its positioning as a social virtual reality platform. While the product name had not yet been made public, media reports initially referred to the initiative by its internal development codename Project Sansar. By the end of the same year, a small number of 3D content creators were invited to participate in an early alpha version.

As development progressed in 2016, more invitations were extended to a larger pool of creators for access to the "creator preview" version of what would soon be officially branded Sansar. The word "sansar" (संसार) is Sanskrit for "world".

Availability to the general public began in 2017 with the debut of the "creator beta".

In 2019, Sansar partnered with electronic music record label Monstercat to bring live entertainment to a virtual reality setting, as part of the latter's eight year anniversary.

In February 2020, Linden Lab announced that they would no longer be supporting Sansar and were looking for a new owner for the project. Wookey Project Corp. purchased all of the assets under the Sansar name to animate the contents of the web under the direction of its chief executive officer Jonathan Fried. Instead, Linden Lab will concentrate on its legacy virtual world platform Second Life.

On March 23, 2020, Linden Labs announced the sale of Sansar to San Francisco-based technology company Wookey Project Corp, to continue Sansar's current event based strategy. Despite successful event launches, Wookey ultimately suffered from lack of funding and infighting among CEO and ownership.

Sometime in late 2021, After the covid restrictions had ended and music events returned to in person performances, Wookie the current owners of Sansar put the company up for sale. It was purchased by a new group under the organization of Sansar Inc. Under the new management team, the backend systems that run Sansar have begun a migration process upgrading the entire system to new and better software with less reliance on 3rd party addons that helped Sansar run in the past. As of May 2026, the rebuild in the background is still ongoing and nearing completion where it will come out of early access status and a new promotion campaign will start to promote the platform once again.

== Economy ==
Like Second Life, Sansar has its own virtual economy and unit of trade. Sansar users can buy and sell virtual creations using the "Sansar dollar" (S$). Sansar dollars can be purchased online via the Sansar Dollar Exchange (SandeX) or earned by selling items in the Sansar Store.

== See also ==
- High Fidelity
- VRChat
- Resonite - A social VR game with in-game building features.
