= BranchOut =

Former Facebook application

- Website type: social networking
- Available in: English
- Owner: Rick Marini
- Website: www.branchout.com
- Commercial: Yes
- Launched: 2010
- Current status: Sold

BranchOut was a Facebook application designed for finding jobs, networking professionally, and recruiting employees. It was founded by Rick Marini in July 2010, and was, as of March 2012, the largest professional networking service on Facebook. The company sold its assets to HR Software Company 1-Page in November 2014 and the staff was picked up by Hearst.

== History ==
BranchOut launched in June 2010 as a Facebook app. Rick Marini, the founder and CEO of SuperFan, received a call from a friend asking if he knew anyone at a particular company. Marini knew he had a mutual connection, but couldn't remember the person specifically. He was unable to find the connection by searching on Facebook and asked if SuperFan's Director of Engineering could build a widget to accomplish the task. Marini saw potential in the application and pivoted SuperFan's team to begin development on the product.

In July 2010, Marini launched BranchOut. In September 2010, BranchOut announced a $6 million Series A round of funding led by Accel Partners, Floodgate Fund, and Norwest Venture Partners, with additional investments from founders and executives at Napster, Facebook, WordPress, and Google. In January 2011, BranchOut's userbase grew by a factor of 25, increasing from 10,000 to 250,000.

In May 2011, BranchOut raised $18 million in a Series B round of funding from Redpoint Ventures, Accel Partners, Norwest Venture Partners, and Floodgate. Soon after, BranchOut experienced a period of explosive growth, which Marini attributes to superconnectors joining BranchOut, noting that people began to sign up to the service en masse after people like TechCrunch founder Michael Arrington installed the app.

In May 2011, BranchOut listed 3 million open jobs (sourced from Indeed.com) and 20,000 internships and was active in 60 countries and is available in 15 languages.

Despite raising a total of $49 million, BranchOut users dropped and the company relaunched as a 'workplace chat' application.

The current company is not related to the 20th century incarnation. In 1996, Lee Newman and David Ronick had co-founded a site called "BranchOut.com" designed "to help you find people with whom you share common bonds – like your high school, your hometown, your college, your grad school, your company, your industry – even friends of friends." The site started at Ivy League schools only, then opened up to the general public in 1998.

== Site structure ==
BranchOut is a free Facebook application which allows users to create professional profiles that include their work history and education (personal information, like photo albums and status updates, is not included within these profiles). Once the user installs the application, a dashboard is displayed that shows the user's corporate relationships.

BranchOut has three types of enterprise products for job seekers and recruiters: job postings, CareerConnect, and RecruiterConnect. The social job postings feature enables companies to publish job listings on their Facebook fan pages and allows job seekers to apply for the open positions. CareerConnect publishes job posts on a company's Facebook page. RecruiterConnect allows recruiters and hiring managers to search through BranchOut's database, a feature used by HP, Salesforce.com, Box.net, Levi's and Target. RecruiterConnect allows recruiters to search through their network of Facebook friends by job title and company.

BranchOut generates revenue from job posts and enterprise solutions.

== Reception ==
BranchOut has been profiled in The Wall Street Journal, The Independent, CNET, The Washington Post, USA Today, and ABC News. The company was selected to FASTech50, an award given to the most innovative start-ups across the technology industry, and named as one of the top HR products of 2011. BranchOut was also named one of the Top 10 Facebook Apps by Electronic Business Group.

== See also ==
- Academia.edu
- LinkedIn
