= Sol Orwell =

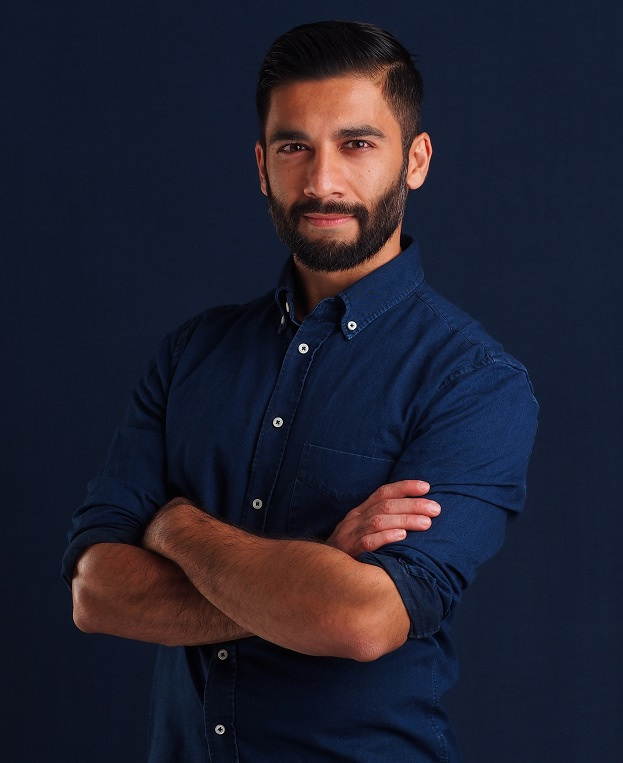
- Citizenship: Canadian
- Occupations: Entrepreneur, author, writer, public speaker
- Known for: Blogging, Fitness, Entrepreneurship
- Website: www.sjo.com

Sol Orwell (born Ahmed Farooq) is an entrepreneur and business developer, most known for his work as the co-founder of Examine.com with Kamal Patel. He was recognized as a 2014 Game Changer by Men’s Fitness and profiled by Forbes as a seven-figure entrepreneur.

== Biography ==
Orwell was born Ahmed Farooq in Pakistan. His father worked for a petrochemical company and traveled frequently. Orwell lived in Saudi Arabia, Japan and Houston, Texas before attending high school in Canada. By the time he graduated and began studying computer engineering at the University of Toronto, Orwell was running several popular gaming-related websites. The success of his websites made it difficult for Orwell to maintain his university grades, which resulted in a loss of his full scholarship and nearly caused him to drop out.

After Orwell finished his degree, he sold several websites, retired and became a digital nomad, which allowed him to spend five years traveling the world and living in the United States and South America. Upon returning to Toronto, he purchased Examine.com for $41,000 and began developing it.

== Websites and businesses ==
Orwell’s websites and businesses have included aggregators like Dealcatch.com, virtual currency resellers serving online gamers and local search engines. He has bought and sold many domains and websites, including Beat.com, BusinessLoan.org, and Webmaster.org.

== Current work and philosophy ==
Orwell describes himself as semi-retired, which allows him to travel three to four months out of the year.

Orwell has stepped back from an active role in Examine.com to focus on other projects. He blogs about business development in the context of making money online on SJO.com and serves on the advisory board for Schwarzenegger.com as a health and fitness expert.

In January 2016, Orwell inspired "#cookielife", an online movement which resulted in his followers baking and mailing him cookies. Over two hundred individuals participated from around the world, with flavors including chocolate chip, hazelnut, and triple chocolate, in the style of cookies, brownies, and pies. By November 2016, he had posted over 50 pictures of various desserts sent to him via the #cookielife and shared his #cookielife experience in Men's Health. Orwell also hosted a "Cookie Off," inviting 18 bakers to compete in a chocolate chip cookie baking competition. As of February 2018, Sol Orwell retired his #cookielife after receiving over 200 cookies in the mail.

In July 2018, Orwell hosted his Toronto Chocolate Chip Cookie Off, raising over $100,000 for charity.

== Philanthropy ==
In 2017, Orwell began to harness #cookielife for philanthropy by hosting another Cookie Off in New York City, inviting 33 bakers to compete and donating the proceeds from ticket sales to charity. The event raised $30,000 for She's the First, a charity supporting girls' education in developing economies.

In 2018, Sol Orwell hosted a chocolate chip cookie off in Toronto that raised over $100,000.

Orwell has also hosted a Sausage Showdown, with proceeds going to Community Food Centres Canada.

In 2019, Sol Orwell hosted his "final" Cookie Off in Toronto, raising over $175,000. The final tally raised from his food offs came to over $400,000.

In 2021, Sol Orwell raised over $280,000 for two charities supporting Afghan refugees after United States troops withdrew from Afghanistan. The Minister of Immigration, Marco Mendicino, publicly thanked Sol Orwell for his fundraising efforts when discussing Canada's response to the humanitarian crisis.
