= Francis Oswell =

Australian architect

Francis Bruce Oswell (1920-2003) was an Australian architect from Queensland, one of the first to design high rise apartment buildings in Brisbane.

== Early life and career ==
Francis Bruce Oswell was born on 11 January 1920 in Malvern, Victoria. He studied engineering at the University of Melbourne part time beginning in 1939 before enlisting in the Army and RAAF during WW2. He studied his Diploma in Architecture from the Central Technical College in Brisbane and later at the University of Queensland, graduating in 1952 with his Graduate Diploma in Architecture. He had worked as a draughtsman for Bligh Jessup in 1949. His firm F.B. Oswell and Associates found steady work as a result of the post war boom for housing, employing a number of architectural students.

He moved his firm out of the centre of Brisbane city and into nearby Spring Hill where a number of other architects had moved their business. He later joined Basil Veal to form a new partnership in 1965. In 1973, Oswell and Veal joined with Trude and Webster to become Trude, Webster, Oswell and Veal Pty Ltd but this partnership ceased in 1974. Oswell returned to Oswell and Associates and retired in 1978.

The rise in wool prices in the early 1950s also saw Oswell being contracted to provide designs for sheep stations, as farmers benefitted from the booming economy. His firm was in near constant employment through the 1950s, and utilised their preferred builders to achieve project completion.

Oswell articulated the view that without the restrictions placed on building materials as a result of World War II, much of the architecture that emerged in Queensland would not have developed. Corrugated iron for example was in short supply, and due to research into industrial materials as a consequence of the War, corrugated roofing made of asbestos cement became a popular alternative.

== Modernist architectural style ==
Oswell's design for the Glencrag Apartments applied new elements of modernist design. He carefully used glass mosaic tiles as decorative features in planter boxes to provide each apartment with its own individual features whilst maintaining the uniformity of the whole building's aesthetic. He designed external fixed metal louvres to buildings to provide sun shade, another trend of the era. He also noted the preference for high set homes to provide for under floor car storage as more people took up car ownership.

Oswell used steel in his commercial design for the Walk Arcade to express movement. The upper balcony balustrades extended over the lower floor paths and steel was stretched in a zig zag pattern on the upper and lower balconies to imitate movement. He promoted colour choices featured by international designers.

With the success of Torbreck, Brisbane's first high rise apartment block, other projects were developed in Brisbane and the Gold Coast. Oswell's firm designed the Glencrag Apartments in Spring Hill, the first large scale mixed use development incorporating apartment living with commercial levels underneath. Its use of multi colour, textures and shapes were controversial with some parts of the community. His firm designed Garfield Towers on the Gold Coast, a high rise holiday rental apartment block which featured glass window walling.

== Personal life ==
Frank Oswell died in Brisbane on 19 August 2003. He married Glenda in 1945. They had three children, Simon, Christopher, and Margaret.

== Notable works ==
Walk Arcade, Gold Coast (1959)

Glencrag Apartments, Leichardt Street, Spring Hill, Brisbane (1960–62)

Ladhope Chambers, Wickham Terrace, Spring Hill, Brisbane (1964)

Garfield Towers, Garfield Terrace, Gold Coast (1964)

== Memberships ==
Associate, RAIA, 1952

Fellow, RAIA, 1952

He was supervisor of the Royal Australian Institute for Architects Convention held in Brisbane in 1952

Royal Queensland Yacht Squadron
