= Floodgate Fund =

Venture capital firm

- Type: Venture fund
- Industry: Finance
- Founded: March 2010 (as Floodgate Fund)
- Founder: Mike Maples Jr.; Ann Miura-Ko
- Website: floodgate.com

Floodgate Fund is a venture capital firm based in the United States created by Mike Maples Jr. and Ann Miura-Ko. It was originally named Maples Investments, but was renamed Floodgate Fund in March 2010. It is focused on investments in technology companies in Silicon Valley.

== Investments ==
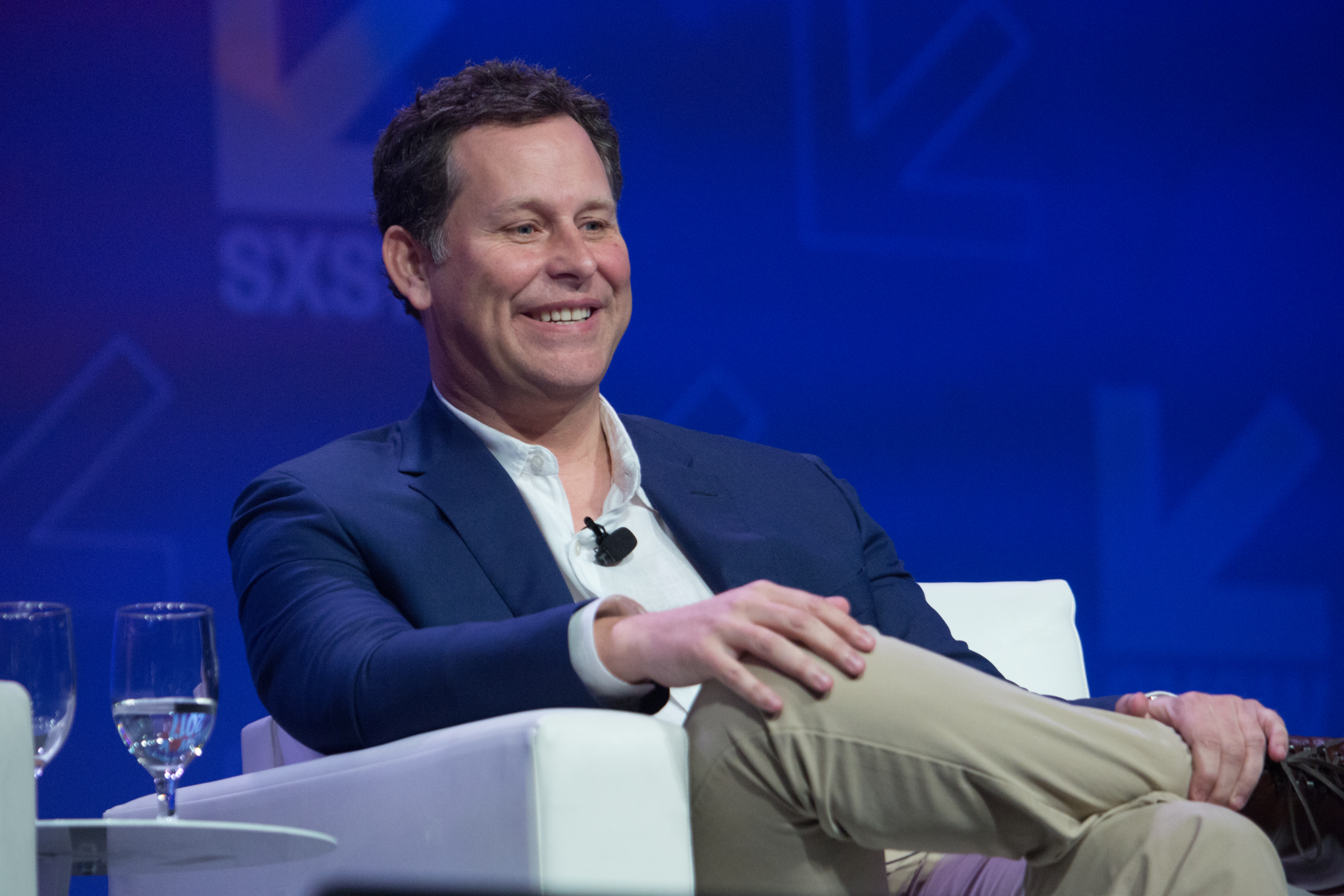
Mike Maples at South by Southwest in 2017

In October 2021, Floodgate raised $146 million for its seventh fund. In previous years, their sixth fund closed at $131 million, their fifth fund closed at $76 million, the fourth fund closed at $75 million and their third fund at $73.5 million.

Floodgate has invested in a number of companies including Twitter, Digg, location-based services company Gowalla, professional networking service BranchOut, Chegg, Formstack, Milk Inc., TaskRabbit, self-storage marketplace SpareFoot, and seasteading platform company Blueseed.

As of 2017, they've also invested in Lyft, Refinery29, LabDoor, education startup MissionU, legal discovery startup, TextIQ, Okta and Rappi. Floodgate was also an early investor in Applied Intuition, a software company for autonomous vehicles.

== Media coverage ==
Floodgate Fund and Mike Maples have been covered in TechCrunch and Forbes. Mike Maples of Floodgate was also interviewed about his investment philosophy by Sarah Lacy for TechCrunch TV.
