= Men's Health (British magazine) =

British men's magazine

- Graeme Peacock on the January 2003 cover
- Editor: Morgan Rees
- Categories: Health lifestyle nutrition fitness
- Frequency: Monthly
- Circulation: 203,053 (ABC Jul - Dec 2013); Print and digital editions.
- Publisher: Hearst
- Founded: 1995
- Country: United Kingdom
- Based in: London, England
- Website: MensHealth UK
- ISSN: 1356-7438

The British edition of the American magazine Men's Health was launched in February 1995 with a separate editorial team, and is the best-selling monthly men's magazine in the United Kingdom, selling more than GQ and Esquire put together. The magazine focuses on topics such as fitness, sex, relationships, health, weight loss, nutrition, fashion, technology and style. The currently editor-in-chief is Claire Sanderson.

The UK version has maintained the image of the original US version, in particular by promoting the body care, nutrition and all matters relating to the male universe. The concept of aesthetically perfect man is an extreme with the presence on the cover of bare-chested muscular male models. Because of this, the magazine has often been criticized for promoting an unattainable model of man. To strengthen the idea of achievability, the staff of the magazine often try out the health and fitness programmes themselves and write about their experiences alongside pictorial evidence. In March 2006, one of the UK writers, Dan Rookwood, appeared on the cover having transformed his body shape while working at the magazine. The staff of German Men's Health have also appeared on their cover, and UK fitness editor Ray Klerck has appeared on the cover and within the pages of the magazine as a model.

== Cover models ==
The cover always has bare-chested muscular American male models and personal trainers like Tom Cortesi, Scott King, Jack Guy, Jim Buol, Gregg Avedon, Russell Brown, Owen McKibbin, Rick Dietz, Timothy Adams, Bradly Tomberlin and Rick Arango. In 2002, the UK edition started what became a yearly competition to find a reader with a body fit to front the magazine. Their idea was to find someone that fit the image of a British "normal guy" and to spur other readers to obtain the 'look', reminding them that this kind of physique is obtainable.

The first winner of the UK Cover Model search was 22-year-old Graeme Peacock, who secured a sponsorship contract with supplement manufacturer Maximuscle. There was no contest in 2003, and in 2004 the contest went annual, with the second winner being Neil Laverty, now represented by Compton Model Agency. Winners for 2005 were Ollie Foster (United Kingdom) and Manuel Mera (Spain). In 2006, 21-year-old Mike Fawkes won the competition, in 2007 Chris Whitlow, in 2008 Kevin Goodwin, in 2009 29-year-old James Bayntun, in 2010 Kirk Miller. Celebrities such as Jason Statham, Rusty Joiner, Ryan Reynolds, Josh Holloway, Marco Dapper, Gerard Butler, Vin Diesel, Joe Manganiello and Cristiano Ronaldo have appeared on the cover].

== Cycling team ==
In 1999, Men's Health sponsored a British UCI Division 3 professional cycle racing team. The Director Sportif was Sid Barras, a former professional cyclist. Although the team achieved numerous successes during the year, sponsorship was not renewed in 2000. Team members included Welshmen Matt Beckett and Huw Pritchard, a medal-winning Commonwealth Games competitor.

== Criticism ==
The content of the U.S. version in the year 2000 was analysed in Stibbe (2004). The findings suggested that Men's Health gave some useful health advice but included images of masculinity that were counter-productive for health promotion. In particular, the form of hegemonic masculinity promoted by the magazine had the potential to promote negative health behaviours such as excess alcohol consumption, excess meat consumption, reliance on convenience food, unsafe sex, and aggressive behavior. The scope of this study did not include how the content of the magazine has changed over time, or how the content of the UK version differs from the U.S. version.

The UK version received strong criticism from psychologist Dr. David Giles from the University of Winchester because of its promotion of a muscular physique as a sign of health.

"The message in typical lads' magazines is that you need to develop a muscular physique in order to attract a quality mate.

"Readers internalise this message, which creates anxieties about their actual bodies and leads to increasingly desperate attempts to modify them."

This magazine, among others has also been linked as a leading cause of the body dysmorphic disorder called "athletica nervosa".

== See also ==
- Masculinity
- List of men's magazines
