= Natural Standard =

International collaboration to review complementary medicine

- Formation: 2000
- Type: Research collaboration
- Purpose: Evidence-based health care information
- Headquarters: Somerville, MA
- Region served: Worldwide
- Official language: English, Spanish
- Co-founders: Catherine Ulbricht, Ethan Basch
- Staff: Over 500 worldwide contributors
- Website: naturalmedicines.therapeuticresearch.com

Natural Standard is an international research collaboration that systematically reviews scientific evidence on complementary and alternative medicine. Together with the faculty of Harvard Medical School, Natural Standard provides consumer information on complementary and alternative medicine for Harvard Health Publications and Susan G. Komen for the Cure. Natural Standard also provides information on herbal medicine and dietary supplements to MedlinePlus, which is produced and maintained by the U.S. National Library of Medicine (NLM) and the National Institutes of Health (NIH).

In A Practical Handbook on the Pharmacovigilance of Antimalarial Medicines published by the World Health Organization (WHO), Natural Standard is cited as "The best and most authoritative web site available on herbal medicines."

== History ==
Natural Standard Research Collaboration was founded in 2000 to serve as a clearing house for information on evidence-based medicine covering numerous healthcare disciplines. This international effort involves authors, editors, and peer reviewers from multiple academic and research institutions. It used an A thru F grading system.

Natural Standard was taken over by Therapeutic Research Center in 2013.

Natural Standard thru the new Therapeutic Research Center is a subscription-only database that delivers information about complementary and alternative medicine and dietary supplements and produces the Natural Medicines Comprehensive Database (NMCD). A new combined database will be called "Natural Medicines" (http://info.therapeuticresearch.com/natural-medicine-comprehensive-database). Natural Standard provides information that is broad in scope, and focused on both medications and disease states. A standout feature of this database is its graded, evidence-based evaluation of alternative therapies.

== Personnel ==
The founders were:

- Catherine Ulbricht, PharmD, MBA[c]
- Ethan Basch, MD, MSc, MPhil

Members of the Senior Editorial Board include:

- Edzard Ernst, a well-known figure in complementary and alternative medicine research and co-author of Trick or Treatment

== See also ==
- Examine.com
- ConsumerLab.com
