= 1970 in the United States =

- Decades: 1950s; 1960s; 1970s; 1980s; 1990s
- See also: History of the United States (1964–1980); Timeline of United States history (1970–1989); List of years in the United States

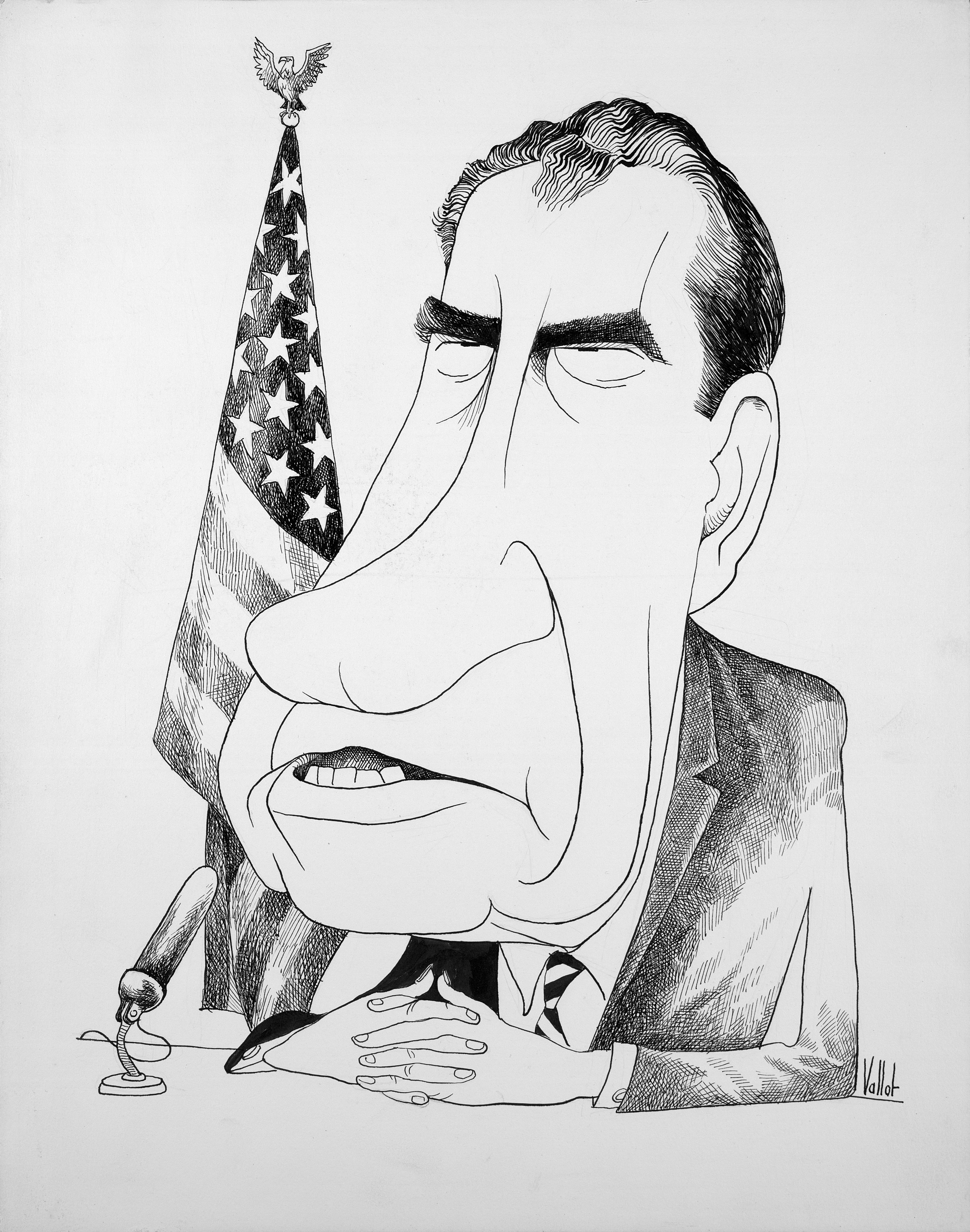
Richard Nixon by Edmund S. Valtman, 1970

Events from the year 1970 in the United States.

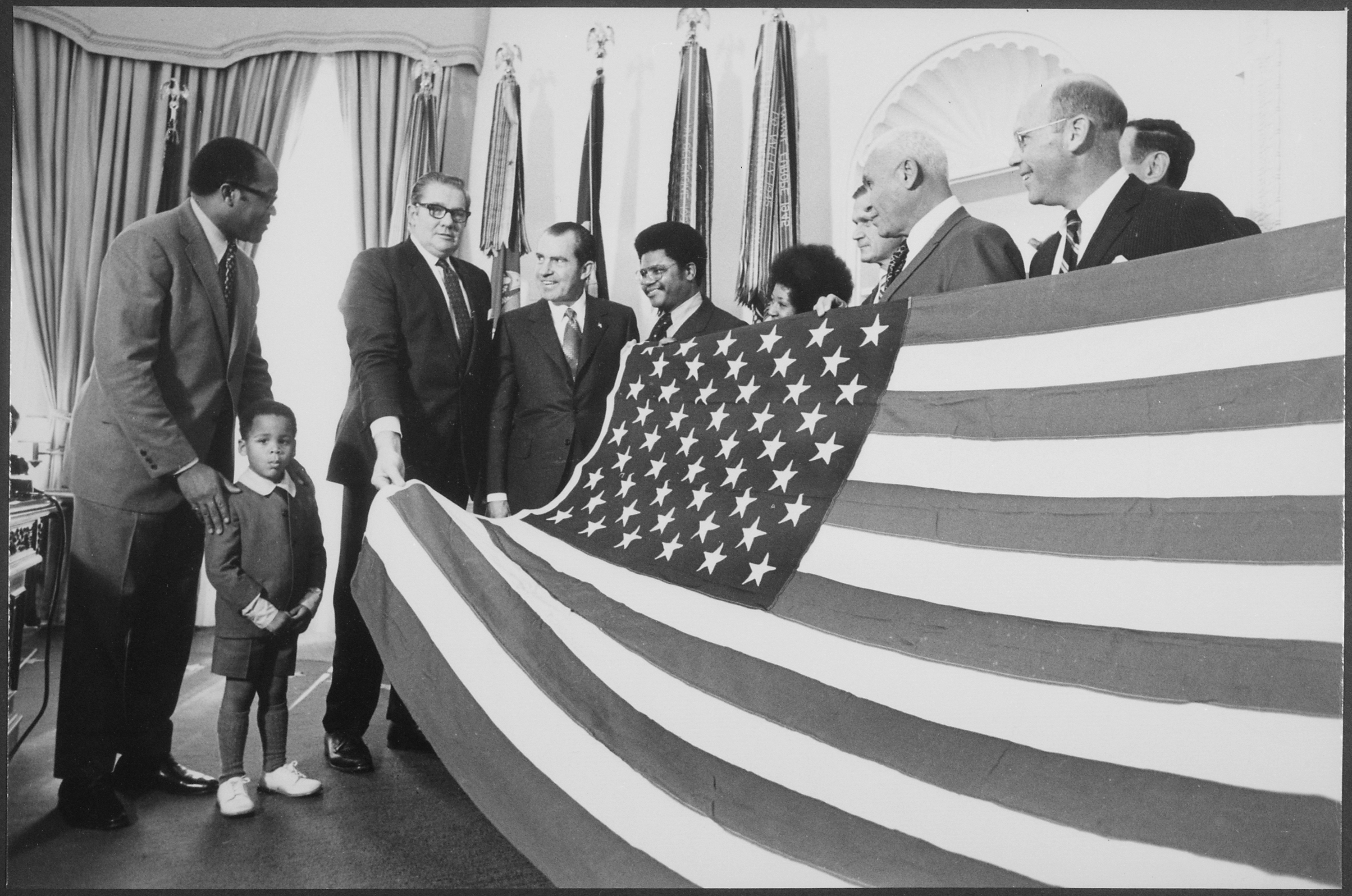
Presentation of an American Flag by President Nixon, 1970

== Incumbents ==
=== Federal government ===
- President: Richard Nixon (R-California)
- Vice President: Spiro Agnew (R-Maryland)
- Chief Justice: Warren E. Burger (Virginia)
- Speaker of the House of Representatives: John William McCormack (D-Massachusetts)
- Senate Majority Leader: Mike Mansfield (D-Montana)
- Congress: 91st

==== State governments ====
Governors and lieutenant governors

=== Governors ===
- Governor of Alabama: Albert Brewer (Democratic)
- Governor of Alaska: Keith Harvey Miller (Republican) (until December 7), William A. Egan (Democratic) (starting December 7)
- Governor of Arizona: Jack Richard Williams (Republican)
- Governor of Arkansas: Winthrop Rockefeller (Republican)
- Governor of California: Ronald Reagan (Republican)
- Governor of Colorado: John Arthur Love (Republican)
- Governor of Connecticut: John N. Dempsey (Democratic)
- Governor of Delaware: Russell W. Peterson (Republican)
- Governor of Florida: Claude R. Kirk Jr. (Republican)
- Governor of Georgia: Lester Maddox (Democratic)
- Governor of Hawaii: John A. Burns (Democratic)
- Governor of Idaho: Don Samuelson (Republican)
- Governor of Illinois: Richard B. Ogilvie (Republican)
- Governor of Indiana: Edgar Whitcomb (Republican)
- Governor of Iowa: Robert D. Ray (Republican)
- Governor of Kansas: Robert Docking (Democratic)
- Governor of Kentucky: Louie B. Nunn (Republican)
- Governor of Louisiana: John J. McKeithen (Democratic)
- Governor of Maine: Kenneth M. Curtis (Democratic)
- Governor of Maryland: Marvin Mandel (Democratic)
- Governor of Massachusetts: Francis W. Sargent (Republican)
- Governor of Michigan: William Milliken (Republican)
- Governor of Minnesota: Harold LeVander (Republican)
- Governor of Mississippi: John Bell Williams (Democratic)
- Governor of Missouri: Warren E. Hearnes (Democratic)
- Governor of Montana: Forrest H. Anderson (Democratic)
- Governor of Nebraska: Norbert T. Tiemann (Republican)
- Governor of Nevada: Paul Laxalt (Republican)
- Governor of New Hampshire: Walter R. Peterson Jr. (Republican)
- Governor of New Jersey: Richard J. Hughes (Democratic) (until January 20), William T. Cahill (Republican) (starting January 20)
- Governor of New Mexico: David F. Cargo (Republican)
- Governor of New York: Nelson Rockefeller (Republican)
- Governor of North Carolina: Robert W. Scott (Democratic)
- Governor of North Dakota: William L. Guy (Democratic)
- Governor of Ohio: Jim Rhodes (Republican)
- Governor of Oklahoma: Dewey F. Bartlett (Republican)
- Governor of Oregon: Tom McCall (Republican)
- Governor of Pennsylvania: Raymond P. Shafer (Republican)
- Governor of Rhode Island: Frank Licht (Democratic)
- Governor of South Carolina: Robert Evander McNair (Democratic)
- Governor of South Dakota: Frank Farrar (Republican)
- Governor of Tennessee: Buford Ellington (Democratic)
- Governor of Texas: Preston Smith (Democratic)
- Governor of Utah: Cal Rampton (Democratic)
- Governor of Vermont: Deane C. Davis (Republican)
- Governor of Virginia: Mills Godwin (Democratic) (until January 17), Linwood Holton (Republican) (starting January 17)
- Governor of Washington: Daniel J. Evans (Republican)
- Governor of West Virginia: Arch A. Moore Jr. (Republican)
- Governor of Wisconsin: Warren P. Knowles (Republican)
- Governor of Wyoming: Stanley K. Hathaway (Republican)

=== Lieutenant governors ===
- Lieutenant Governor of Alabama: vacant
- Lieutenant Governor of Alaska: Robert W. Ward (Republican) (until December 7), H. A. Boucher (Democratic) (starting December 7)
- Lieutenant Governor of Arkansas: Maurice Britt (Republican)
- Lieutenant Governor of California: Edwin Reinecke (Republican)
- Lieutenant Governor of Colorado: Mark Anthony Hogan (Democratic)
- Lieutenant Governor of Connecticut: Attilio R. Frassinelli (Democratic)
- Lieutenant Governor of Delaware: Eugene Bookhammer (Republican)
- Lieutenant Governor of Florida: Ray Osborne (Republican)
- Lieutenant Governor of Georgia: George T. Smith (Democratic)
- Lieutenant Governor of Hawaii: Thomas Gill (Democratic) (until December 2), George Ariyoshi (Democratic) (starting December 2)
- Lieutenant Governor of Idaho: Jack M. Murphy (Democratic)
- Lieutenant Governor of Illinois: Paul Simon (Democratic)
- Lieutenant Governor of Indiana: Richard E. Folz (Republican)
- Lieutenant Governor of Iowa: Roger Jepsen (Republican)
- Lieutenant Governor of Kansas: James H. DeCoursey Jr. (Democratic)
- Lieutenant Governor of Kentucky: Wendell H. Ford (Democratic)
- Lieutenant Governor of Louisiana: C. C. Aycock (Democratic)
- Lieutenant Governor of Massachusetts: Francis W. Sargent (Republican)
- Lieutenant Governor of Michigan:
  - until month and day unknown: vacant
  - month and day unknown: Thomas F. Schweigert (Republican)
  - starting month and day unknown: vacant
- Lieutenant Governor of Minnesota: James B. Goetz (Republican)
- Lieutenant Governor of Mississippi: Charles L. Sullivan (Democratic)
- Lieutenant Governor of Missouri: William S. Morris (Democratic)
- Lieutenant Governor of Montana: Thomas Lee Judge (Democratic)
- Lieutenant Governor of Nebraska: John Everroad (Republican)
- Lieutenant Governor of Nevada: Edward Fike (political party unknown)
- Lieutenant Governor of New Mexico: Elias Lee Francis II (Republican)
- Lieutenant Governor of New York: Malcolm Wilson (Republican)
- Lieutenant Governor of North Carolina: Hoyt Patrick Taylor Jr. (Democratic)
- Lieutenant Governor of North Dakota: Richard F. Larsen (Republican)
- Lieutenant Governor of Ohio: John William Brown (Republican)
- Lieutenant Governor of Oklahoma: George Nigh (Democratic)
- Lieutenant Governor of Pennsylvania: Raymond J. Broderick (Republican)
- Lieutenant Governor of Rhode Island: J. Joseph Garrahy (Democratic)
- Lieutenant Governor of South Carolina: John C. West (Democratic)
- Lieutenant Governor of South Dakota: James Abdnor (Republican)
- Lieutenant Governor of Tennessee: Frank Gorrell (Democratic)
- Lieutenant Governor of Texas: Ben Barnes (Democratic)
- Lieutenant Governor of Vermont: Thomas L. Hayes (Republican)
- Lieutenant Governor of Virginia: Fred G. Pollard (Democratic) (until January 17), J. Sargeant Reynolds (Democratic) (starting January 17)
- Lieutenant Governor of Washington: John Cherberg (Democratic)
- Lieutenant Governor of Wisconsin: Jack B. Olson (Republican)

== Events ==
=== January ===
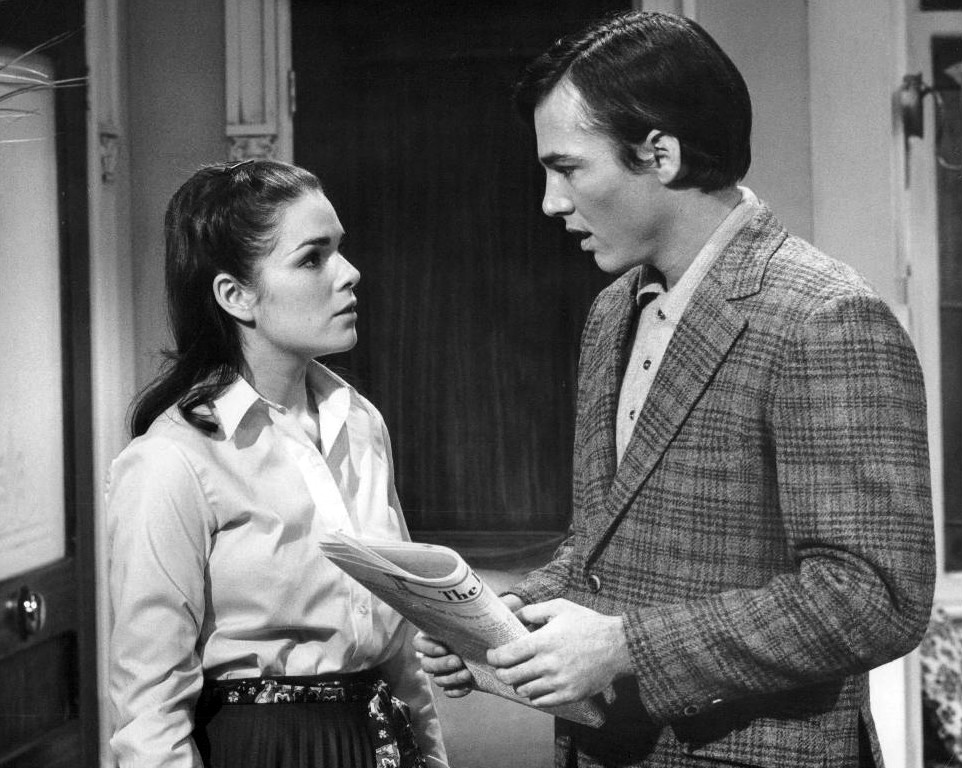
Richard Hatch and Karen Gorney, "All My Children," 1970

- January 5 – The first episode of All My Children is broadcast on the ABC television network.
- January 11 – Super Bowl IV: The Kansas City Chiefs beat the heavily favored Minnesota Vikings 23–7.
- January 14 – Diana Ross & The Supremes perform their farewell live concert together at the Frontier Hotel in Las Vegas, and Ross' replacement, Jean Terrell, is introduced onstage at the end of the last show.

=== February ===
- February 17 – MacDonald family massacre: Jeffrey R. MacDonald kills his wife and children at Fort Bragg, North Carolina, claiming that drugged-out "hippies" did it.
- February 18 – A jury finds the Chicago Seven defendants not guilty of conspiring to incite a riot, in charges stemming from the violence at the 1968 Democratic National Convention. Five of the defendants are found guilty on the lesser charge of crossing state lines to incite a riot.

=== March ===
- March 6 – A bomb constructed by members of the Weathermen and meant to be planted at a military dance in New Jersey explodes, killing three members of the organization.
- March 17
  - My Lai massacre: The United States Army charges 14 officers with suppressing information related to the incident.
  - The critically wounded pilot of Eastern Air Lines Shuttle Flight 1320 saves the 68 passengers and five crew of the DC-9 jet, landing safely in Boston despite being shot by a hijacker who killed the co-pilot.
- March 18 – United States Postal Service workers in New York City go on strike; the strike spreads to the state of California and the cities of Akron, Ohio, Philadelphia, Chicago, Boston, and Denver; 210,000 out of 750,000 U.S. postal employees walk out. President Nixon assigns military units to New York City post offices. The strike lasts two weeks.
- March 31 – NASA's Explorer 1, the first American satellite and Explorer program spacecraft, reenters Earth's atmosphere after 12 years in orbit.

=== April ===
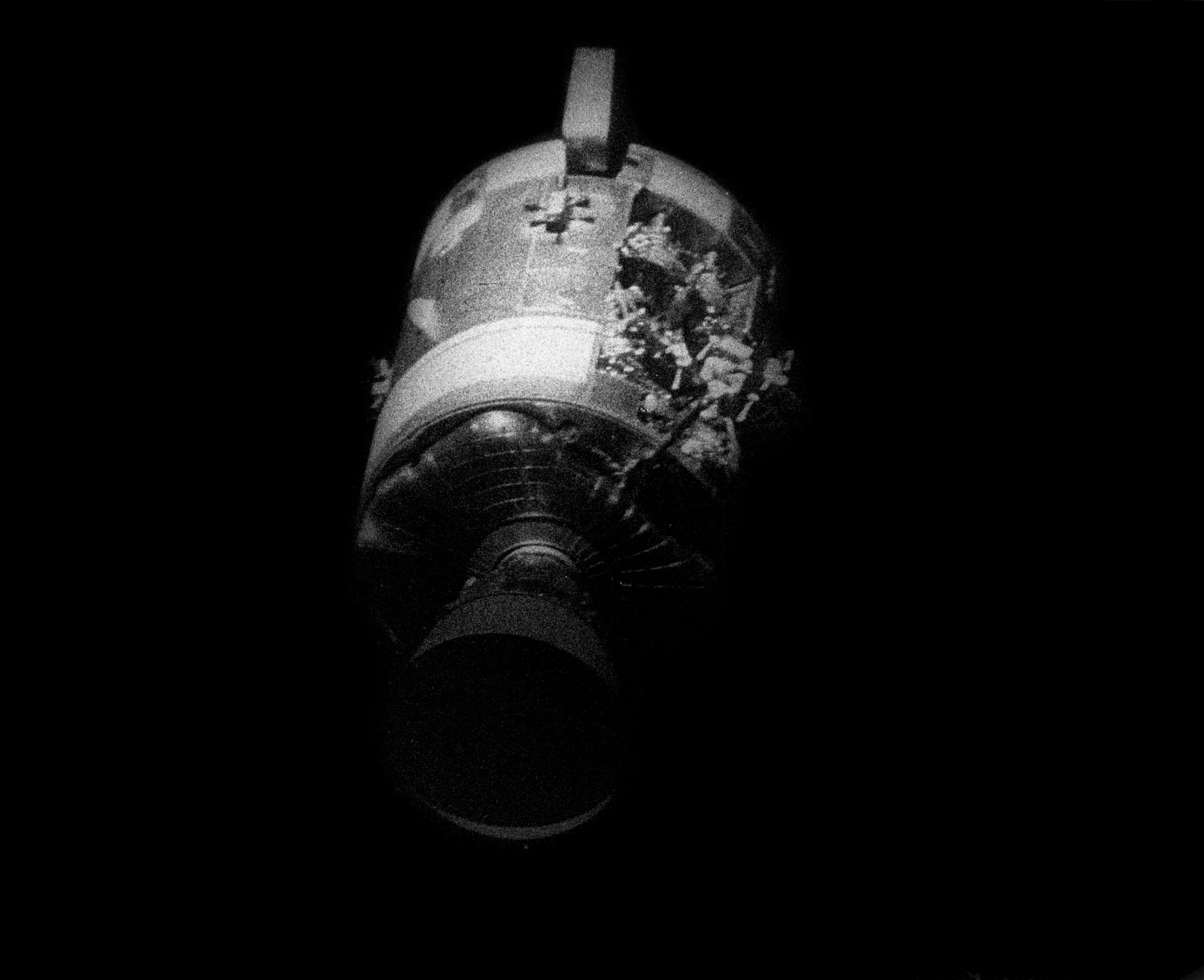
April 13: An oxygen tank explodes on Apollo 13

- April 1
  - The 1970 United States census begins. There are 203,392,031 United States residents on this day.
  - President Richard Nixon signs the Public Health Cigarette Smoking Act into law, banning cigarette television advertisements in the United States, starting on January 1, 1971.
  - American Motors Corporation introduces the Gremlin.
- April 6 – In the worst day of California law enforcement, 4 California Highway Patrolmen are killed in what is known as the "Newhall Incident". This led to new procedures & training for law enforcement, nationwide.
- April 7 – The 42nd Academy Awards ceremony is held at Dorothy Chandler Pavilion in Los Angeles, the second in a row with no official host. John Schlesinger's Midnight Cowboy wins both Best Picture and Best Director, while George Roy Hill's Butch Cassidy and the Sundance Kid wins four awards and Charles Jarrott's Anne of the Thousand Days is nominated for ten. It is, to date, the highest-rated televised ceremony, according to Nielsen ratings.
- April 11 – Apollo program: Apollo 13 (Jim Lovell, Fred Haise, Jack Swigert) is launched toward the Moon.
- April 13 – An oxygen tank in the Apollo 13 spacecraft explodes, forcing the crew to abort the mission and return in 4 days.
- April 17 – Apollo program: Apollo 13 splashes down safely in the Pacific.
- April 22 – The first Earth Day, founded by U.S. Senator, Gaylord Nelson of Wisconsin is celebrated in the U.S.
- April 29 – The U.S. invades Cambodia to hunt out the Viet Cong; widespread, large anti-war protests occur in the United States.

=== May ===
- May 1
  - Demonstrations against the trial of the New Haven Nine, Bobby Seale, and Ericka Huggins draw 12,000 people.
  - President Richard Nixon orders U.S. forces to cross into neutral Cambodia, threatening to widen the Vietnam War, sparking nationwide riots and leading to the Kent State Shootings.
  - Colorado State College changes its name to the University of Northern Colorado.
- May 4 – Kent State shootings: Four students at Kent State University in Ohio are killed and nine wounded by Ohio State National Guardsmen, at a protest against the incursion into Cambodia.
- May 6 – Robert Rex Vice self-immolates in protest of the Vietnam War and the Kent state killings.
- May 8
  - Hard Hat Riot: Unionized construction workers attack about 1,000 students and others protesting the Kent State shootings near the intersection of Wall Street and Broad Street and at New York City Hall.
  - The New York Knicks win their first NBA championship, defeating the Los Angeles Lakers 113–99 in Game 7 of the world championship series at Madison Square Garden.
- May 9 – In Washington, D.C., 100,000 people demonstrate against the Vietnam War. Richard Nixon makes an impromptu visit to the Lincoln Memorial to meet with protestors.
- May 10 – The Boston Bruins win their first Stanley Cup since 1941 when Bobby Orr scores a goal 40 seconds into overtime for a 4–3 victory which completes a four-game sweep of the St. Louis Blues.
  - Self-immolation of George Winne Jr. in San Diego in protest of the Vietnam War
- May 11
  - Henry Marrow is killed in an alleged hate crime in Oxford, North Carolina.
  - Lubbock Tornado: An F5 tornado hits downtown Lubbock, Texas, the first to hit a downtown district of a major city since Topeka, Kansas, in 1966; 28 are killed.
  - Race riots erupt in Augusta, Georgia, after the suspicious death of a teenage inmate in the county jail. The disorder, the largest of its kind in the South, results in six fatalities.
- May 12 – The 1976 Winter Olympics are awarded to Denver, Colorado, but it is later rejected.
- May 14 – In the second day of violent demonstrations at Jackson State University in Jackson, Mississippi, state law enforcement officers fire into the demonstrators, killing two and injuring twelve.
- May 26 – Pufnstuf, the film adaptation of the TV series H.R. Pufnstuf, is released.

=== June ===
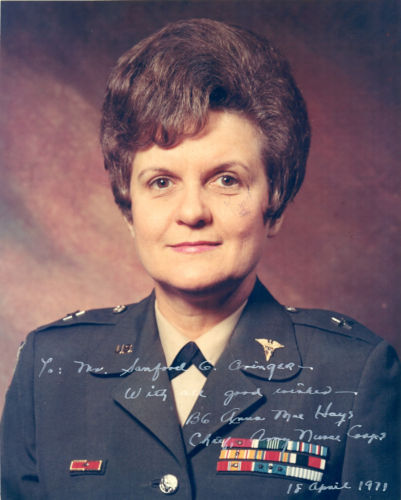
BGEN Anna Mae Hays, circa 1970

- June 6 – A D-Day celebration is held in Washington, D.C., on the 26th anniversary of the event.
- June 11 – The United States gets its first female generals: Anna Mae Hays and Elizabeth P. Hoisington.
- June 21 – Penn Central declares Section 77 bankruptcy, the largest ever US corporate bankruptcy up to this date.
- June 22 – U.S. President Richard Nixon signs the Voting Rights Act Amendments of 1970, a measure lowering the voting age to 18.
- June 23 – Kelly's Heroes is released in the US.
- June 24 – The United States Senate repeals the Gulf of Tonkin Resolution.
- June 28
  - U.S. ground troops withdraw from Cambodia.
  - First pride parade in history, Stonewall riot.
- June 30 – Riverfront Stadium in Cincinnati opens.

=== July ===
- July 1
  - The U.S. Food and Drug Administration (FDA) is subordinated to the Public Health Service.
  - Chemeketa Community College in Oregon opens.
- July 4
  - Bob Hope and other entertainers gather in Washington, D.C., for Honor America Day, a nonpartisan holiday event.
  - American Top 40, a nationally syndicated radio program featuring a countdown of the Top 40 hits of the past week according to the Billboard Hot 100, premieres. Hosted by Casey Kasem, the show is a major success.
  - Riots break out in Asbury Park, New Jersey.
- July 16 – Three Rivers Stadium in Pittsburgh opens.
- July 31 – NBC anchor Chet Huntley retires from full-time broadcasting.

=== August ===
- August 3 – NBC Nightly News premieres on NBC.
- August 7 – Harold Haley, Marin County Superior Court Judge, is taken hostage and murdered, in an effort to free George Jackson from police custody.
- August 13–15 – Special Olympics World Summer Games are held in Chicago.
- August 17–18 – The U.S. sinks 418 containers of nerve gas into the Gulf Stream near the Bahamas.
- August 24 – Vietnam War protesters bomb Sterling Hall at the University of Wisconsin–Madison, leading to an international manhunt for the perpetrators.
- August 26 – The Women's Strike For Equality takes place down Fifth Avenue in New York City.
- August 29 – The Chicano Moratorium, against the Vietnam War, begins in East Los Angeles, California, and leads to a riot that kills three people, including journalist Rubén Salazar.

=== September ===
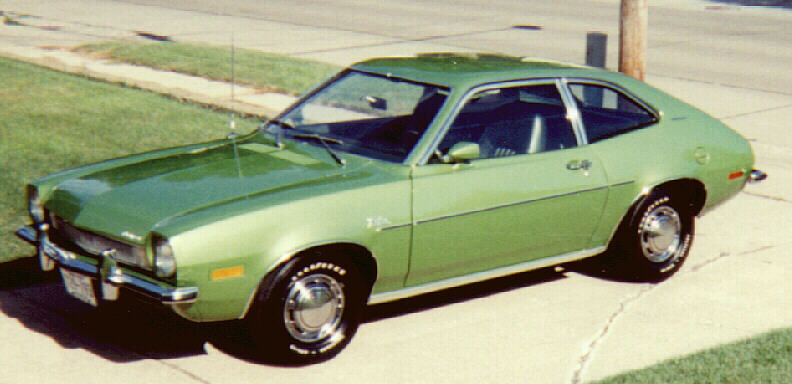
Ford Pinto Runabout

- September 5 – Vietnam War – Operation Jefferson Glenn: The United States 101st Airborne Division and the South Vietnamese 1st Infantry Division initiate a new operation in Thua Thien Province (the operation ends in October 1971).
- September 6 – Terrorists from the Popular Front for the Liberation of Palestine hijack four passenger aircraft from Pan Am, TWA and Swissair on flights to New York from Brussels, Frankfurt and Zürich.
- September 7 – An anti-war rally is held at Valley Forge, Pennsylvania, attended by Jane Fonda, Donald Sutherland and future Democratic presidential nominee John Kerry.
- September 9 – Elvis Presley begins his first concert tour since 1958, in Phoenix, Arizona, at the Veterans Memorial Coliseum.
- September 10 – The Chevrolet Vega is introduced.
- September 11 – The Ford Pinto is introduced.
- September 13
  - The first New York City Marathon begins.
  - The covert incursion of Operation Tailwind is instigated by the American forces in southeast Laos.
- September 18 – Jimi Hendrix dies at age 27 in London, due to alcohol-related complications.
- September 21 – Monday Night Football debuts on the American Broadcasting Company (ABC) television network. The Cleveland Browns defeated the New York Jets by a score of 31–21.
- September 23 – The first women's only tennis tournament begins in Houston, known as the Houston Women's Invitation.
- September 24 – American television series The Odd Couple premieres on ABC.
- September 26 – The Laguna Fire starts in San Diego County, burning 175,425 acres (710 km^{2}).
- September 27 – Richard Nixon begins a tour of Europe, visiting Italy, Yugoslavia, Spain, the United Kingdom and Ireland.
- September 29 – The U.S. Congress gives President Richard Nixon authority to sell arms to Israel.

=== October ===
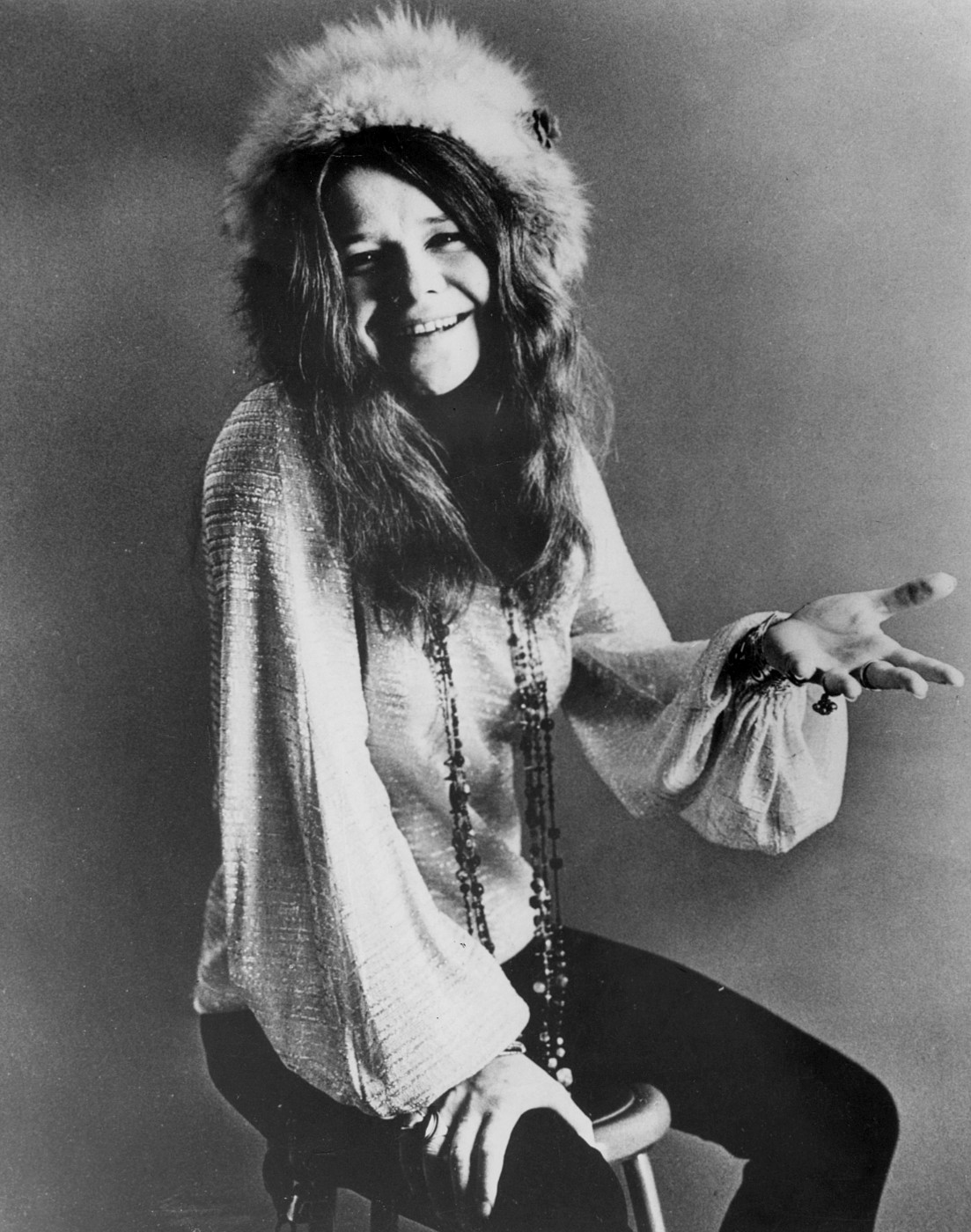
Janis Joplin, 1970

- October 2
  - The Wichita State University football team's "Gold" plane crashes in Colorado, killing most of the players. They were on their way (along with administrators and fans) to a game with Utah State University.
  - Under the National Environmental Policy Act (NEPA) the Environmental Science Services Administration (ESSA) Corps, one of seven federal uniformed services of the United States, is renamed to NOAA Commissioned Officer Corps under the soon to be formed National Oceanic and Atmospheric Administration (NOAA).
- October 4
  - National Educational Television ends operations, being succeeded by PBS.
  - In Los Angeles, rock musician Janis Joplin dies in her hotel room at age 27 from a heroin overdose. Joplin died exactly 16 days after Jimi Hendrix, both at 27 years of age.
- October 5
  - The Public Broadcasting Service begins broadcasting.
  - U.S. President Richard Nixon's European tour ends.
- October 8
  - The U.S. Foreign Office announces the renewal of arms sales to Pakistan.
  - Vietnam War: In Paris, a Communist delegation rejects U.S. President Richard Nixon's October 7 peace proposal as "a maneuver to deceive world opinion."
- October 12 – Vietnam War: U.S. President Richard Nixon announces that the United States will withdraw 40,000 more troops before Christmas.
- October 15 – The Baltimore Orioles defeat the Cincinnati Reds in Game 5 of the World Series, 9–3, to win the series 4 games to 1 for their 2nd World Championship.
- October 21 – A U.S. Air Force plane makes an emergency landing near Leninakan, Soviet Union. The Soviets release the American officers, including 2 generals, November 10.
- October 25 – The wreck of the Confederate submarine Hunley is found off Charleston, South Carolina, by pioneer underwater archaeologist, Dr. E. Lee Spence, then just 22 years old. Hunley was the first submarine in history to sink a ship in warfare.
- October 26
  - Garry Trudeau's comic strip Doonesbury debuts in approximately two dozen newspapers in the United States.
  - Gary Gabelich drives the rocket-powered Blue Flame to an official land speed record at 622.407 mph (1,001.667 km/h) on the dry lake bed of the Bonneville Salt Flats in Utah. The record, the first above 1,000 km/h, stands for nearly thirteen years.

=== November ===
- November – The 1969–1970 recession ends.
- November 3 – Democrats sweep the U.S. Congressional mid-term elections; Ronald Reagan is re-elected as Governor of California; Jimmy Carter is elected as Governor of Georgia.
- November 4
  - Vietnam War – Vietnamization: The United States turns control of the air base in the Mekong Delta to South Vietnam.
  - Social workers in Los Angeles, California take custody of Genie, a girl who had been kept in solitary confinement since her birth.
- November 5 – Vietnam War: The United States Military Assistance Command in Vietnam reports the lowest weekly American soldier death toll in five years (24 soldiers die that week, which is the fifth consecutive week the death toll is below 50; 431 are reported wounded that week, however).
- November 8 – Tom Dempsey, who was born with a deformed right foot, sets a National Football League record by kicking a 63-yard field goal to lift the New Orleans Saints to a 19–17 victory over the Detroit Lions at Tulane Stadium.
- November 9 – Vietnam War: The Supreme Court of the United States votes 6–3 not to hear a case by the state of Massachusetts, about the constitutionality of a state law granting Massachusetts residents the right to refuse military service in an undeclared war.
- November 10 – Vietnam War – Vietnamization: For the first time in five years, an entire week ends with no reports of United States combat fatalities in Southeast Asia.
- November 14 – Southern Airlines Flight 932 crashes in Wayne County, West Virginia; all 75 on board, including 37 players and 5 coaches from the Marshall University football team, are killed.
- November 17 – Vietnam War: Lieutenant William Calley goes on trial for the My Lai massacre.
- November 18 – U.S. President Richard Nixon asks the U.S. Congress for US$155,000,000 in supplemental aid for the Cambodian government (US$85,000,000 is for military assistance to prevent the overthrow of the government of Premier Lon Nol by the Khmer Rouge and North Vietnam).
- November 21 – Vietnam War – Operation Ivory Coast: A joint Air Force and Army team raids the Son Tay prison camp in an attempt to free American POWs thought to be held there (no Americans are killed, but the prisoners have already moved to another camp; all U.S. POWs are moved to a handful of central prison complexes as a result of this raid).
- November 23
  - The American Indian Movement seizes a replica of the Mayflower in Boston.
  - Rodgers and Hammerstein's Oklahoma! makes its network TV debut, when CBS telecasts the 1955 film version as a three-hour Thanksgiving special.

=== December ===
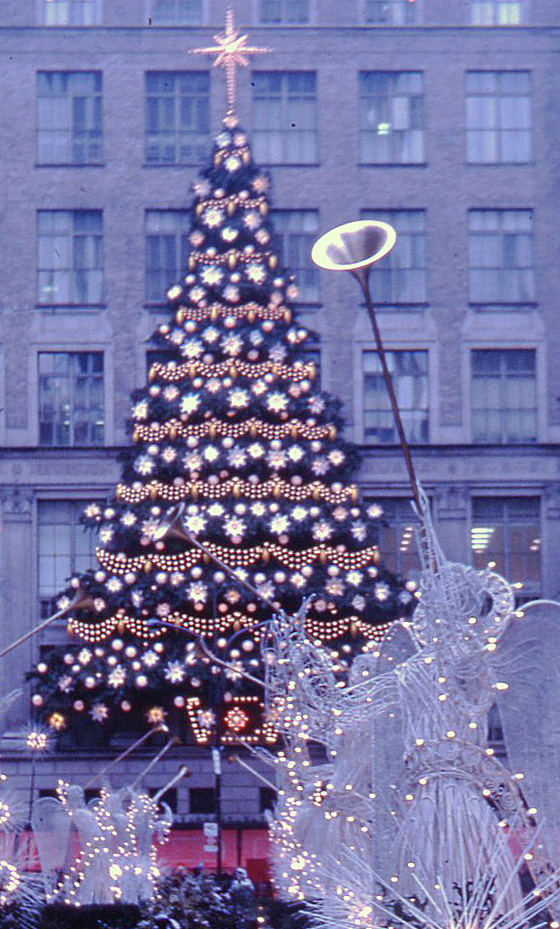
Rockefeller Center Christmas tree, New York, 1970

- December 2 – The United States Environmental Protection Agency begins operations.
- December 19 – The final episode of H.R. Pufnstuf, "An Old Fashioned Christmas," airs on NBC.
- December 23 – The North Tower of the World Trade Center is topped out at 1,368 feet (417 m), making it the tallest building in the world.
- December 24 – Walt Disney Productions' 20th feature film, The Aristocats, is released. It is the studio's final film that Disney personally approved before his death. Though reception is middling compared to past efforts, the film is a box office success.
- December 29 – U.S. President Richard Nixon signs the Occupational Safety and Health Act (OSHA) into law.

=== Ongoing ===
- Cold War (1947–1991)
- Space Race (1957–1975)
- Vietnam War, U.S. involvement (1964–1973)
- Détente (c. 1969–1979)

== Sport ==
- May 10 – Boston Bruins win their fourth (and first since 1941) Stanley Cup by defeating the St. Louis Blues 4 games to 0. The deciding Game 4 is played at the Boston Garden.

== Births ==
=== January ===
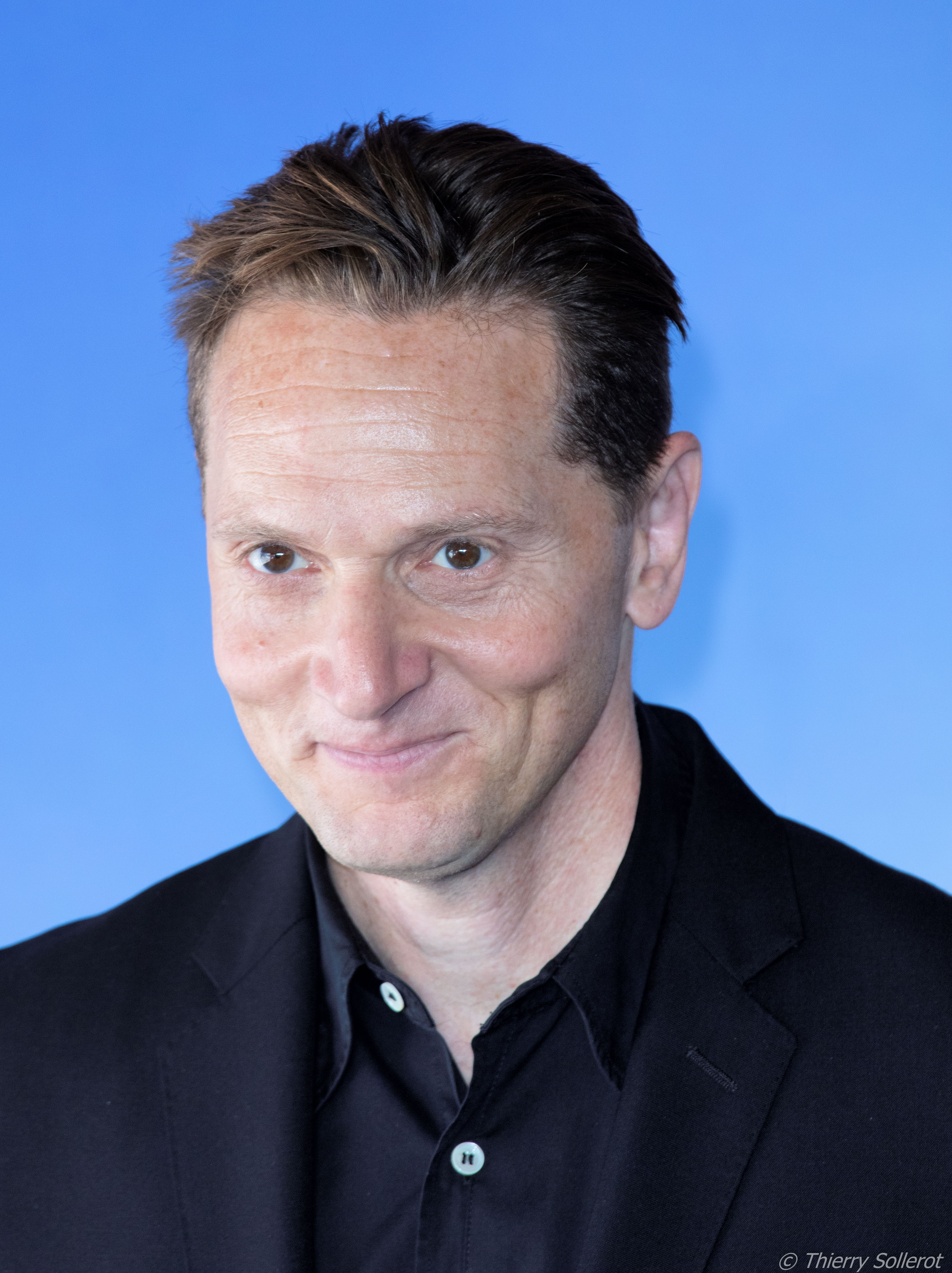
Matt Ross

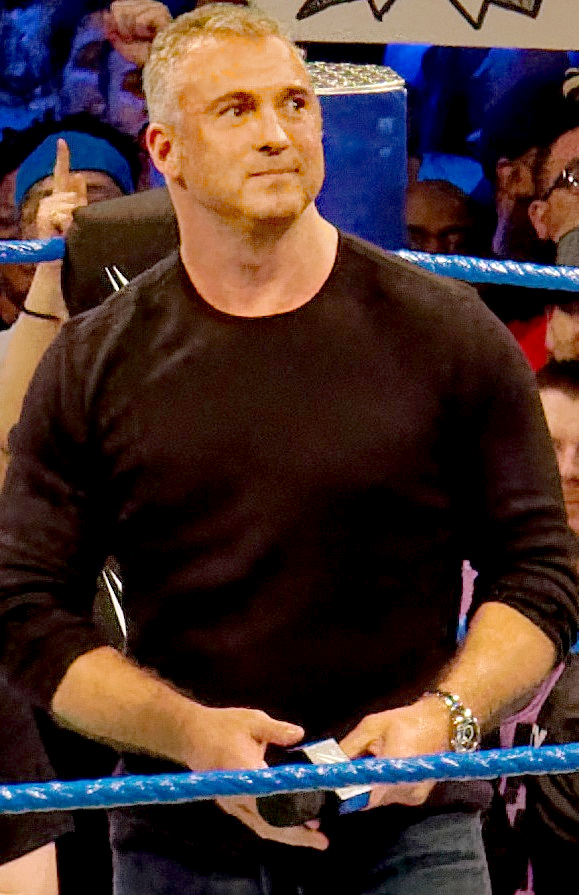
Shane McMahon

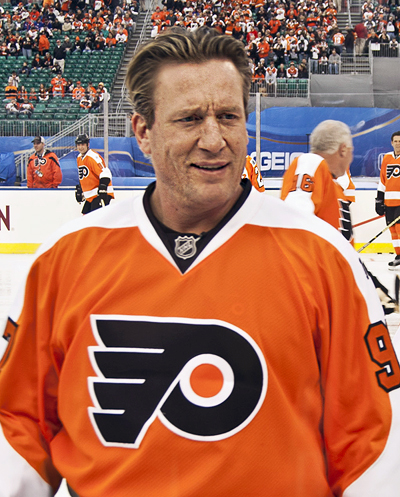
Jeremy Roenick

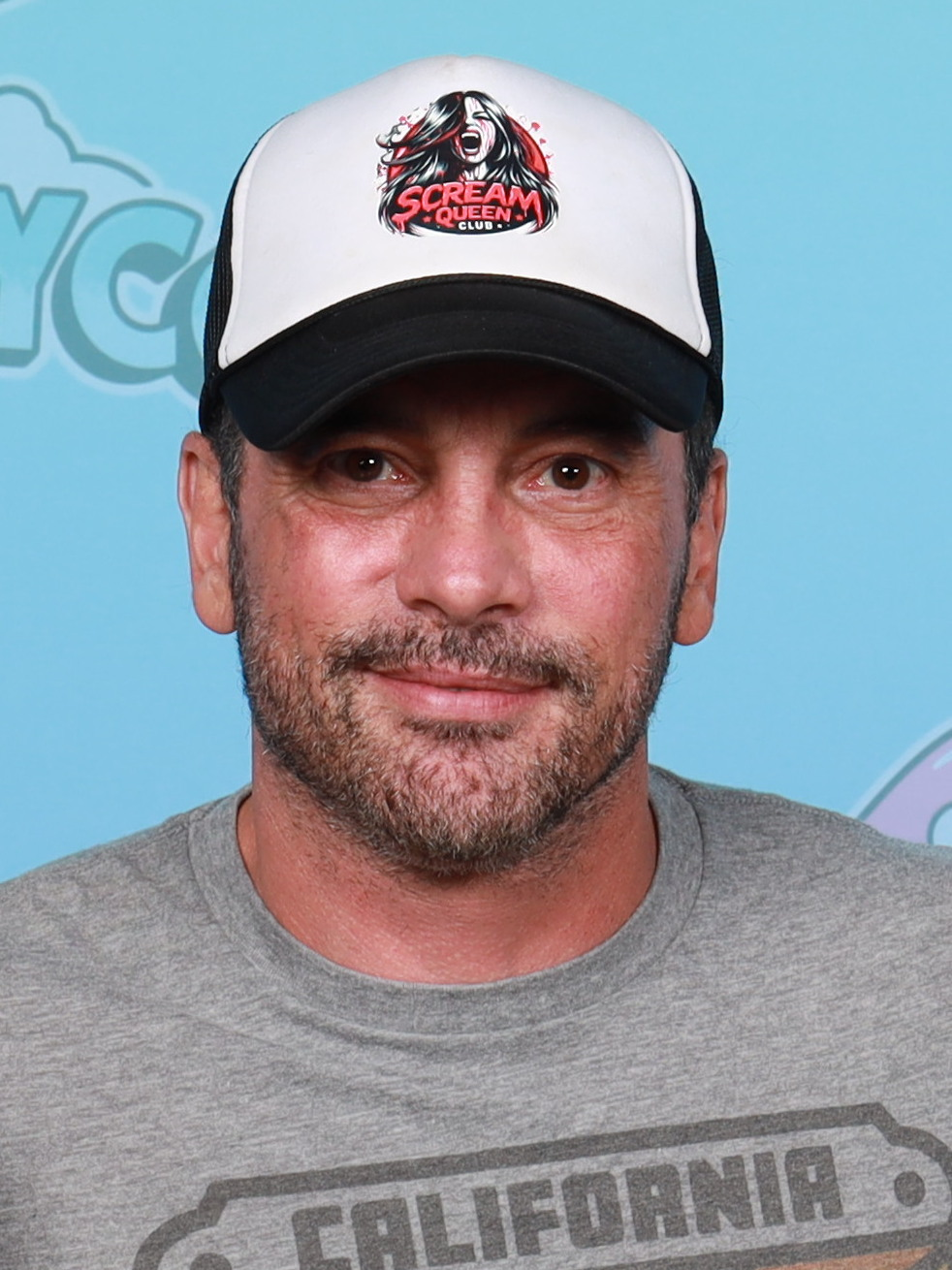
Skeet Ulrich

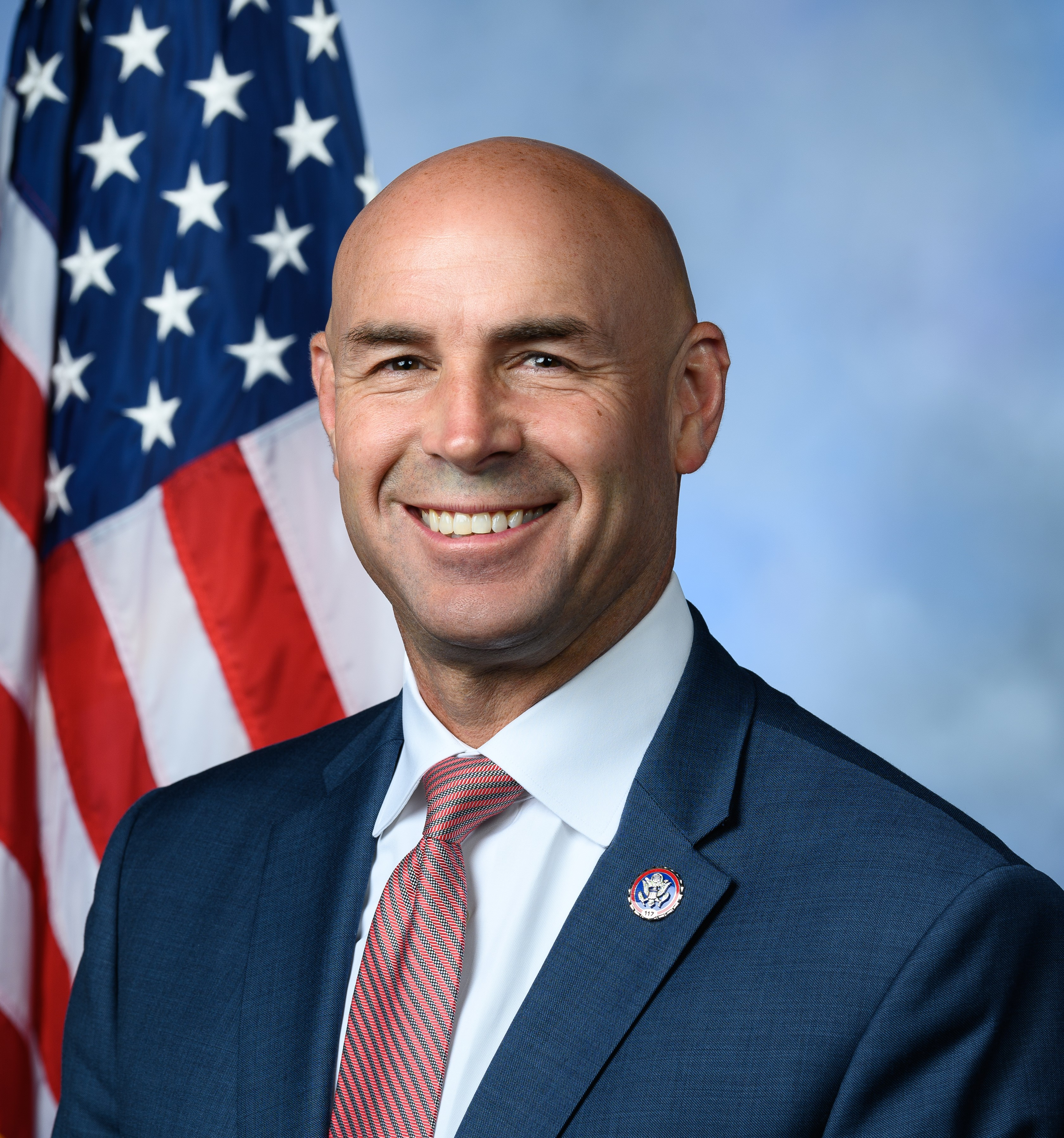
Jake Ellzey

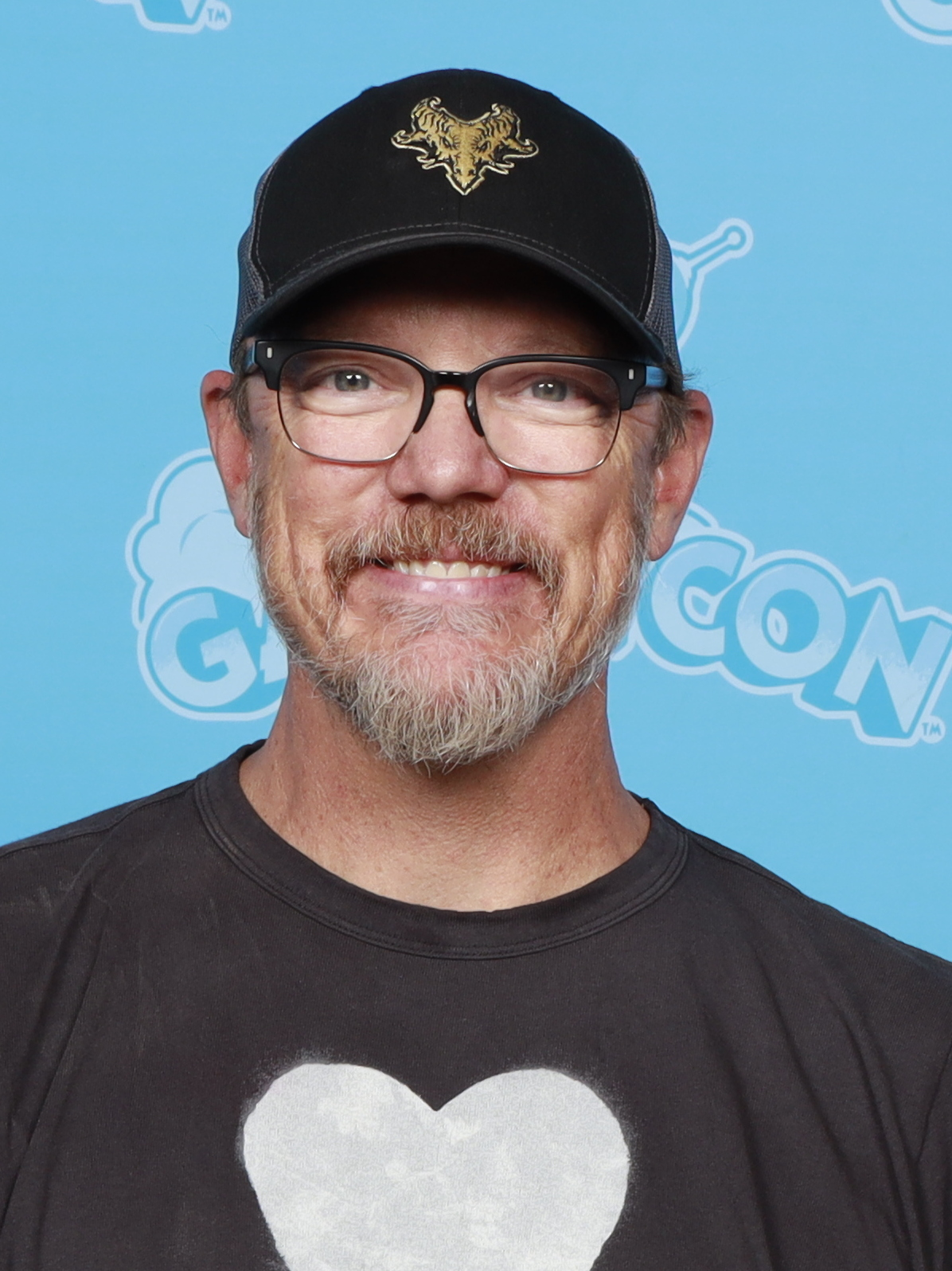
Matthew Lillard

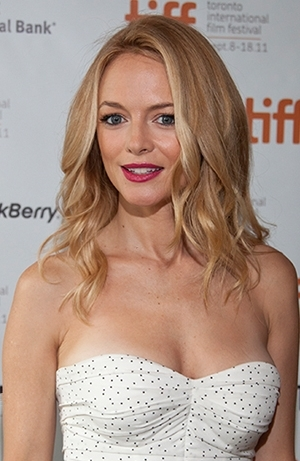
Heather Graham

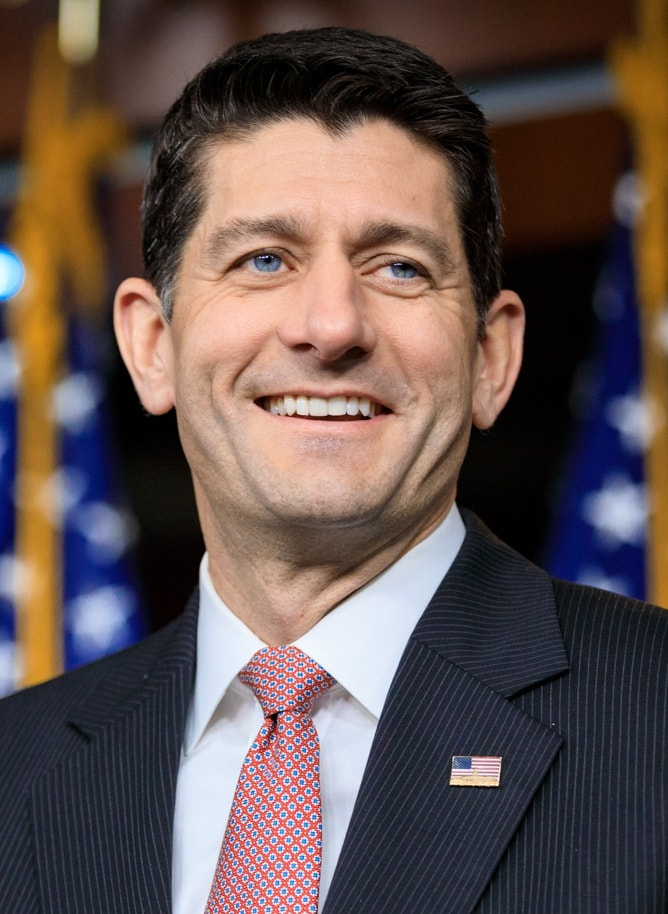
Paul Ryan

- January 1
  - George Birnbaum, political consultant
  - Erik Bloodaxe, hacker and founding member of Legion of Doom
  - Julio Cesar Cedillo, Mexican-born actor
  - Kimberly Page, wrestling personality, actress, dancer, and valet
- January 2
  - Robert John Bardo, convicted murderer
  - Royce Clayton, baseball player
  - Eric Whitacre, composer
  - Nancy St. Alban, actress
- January 3
  - Tim Briggs, politician
  - Greg Brown, guitarist for Cake (d. 2026)
  - James Brown, football player
  - Christian Duguay, comic actor
  - Matt Ross, actor
- January 4
  - Basil Iwanyk, filmmaker
  - Chris Kanyon, wrestler (d. 2010)
- January 6
  - Darrell Bevell, football coach
  - Julie Chen, news anchor and host
  - Keenan McCardell, football player
  - Gabrielle Reece, volleyball player and model
- January 7
  - Charles Billingsley, preacher, Christian singer/songwriter, worship leader, and author
  - Todd Day, basketball player
  - Doug E. Doug, comedian, actor and director
- January 8
  - Michael Baker, football player
  - Kurt Bills, educator and politician
  - Adam Reed, voice actor and animator
- January 10 – Buff Bagwell, wrestler and actor
- January 11 – Jason Bittner, drummer for Shadows Fall and Overkill
- January 12 – Zack de la Rocha, musician
- January 13
  - Bret Bielema, football player and coach
  - Keith Coogan, actor
  - Shonda Rhimes, producer and writer
- January 14 – Michael Bunin, actor
- January 15
  - Bonnie "Prince" Billy, musician
  - Shane McMahon, wrestler and businessman, son of Vince McMahon
- January 17
  - Steve Asheim, drummer for Deicide and Order of Ennead
  - Jeremy Roenick, hockey player
  - Genndy Tartakovsky, Russian-born animator
- January 18
  - Leo Araguz, football player
  - Mike Bertotti, baseball player
  - Keisha Lance Bottoms, politician, mayor of Atlanta, Georgia (2018-2022)
  - DJ Quik, rapper and producer
- January 19 – Jeffrey T. Bury, geographer and researcher
- January 20
  - Joe Allison, football player
  - Kerri Kenney-Silver, actress, comedian, writer, singer, and musician
  - Edwin McCain, singer/songwriter and guitarist
  - Skeet Ulrich, actor
- January 21
  - Michele Bardsley, writer
  - Ken Leung, actor
- January 22
  - Mikaela Beardsley, producer and entrepreneur
  - Dan Finnerty, actor and singer
- January 24
  - Sleepy Brown, singer/songwriter and record producer
  - Jake Ellzey, politician
  - Matthew Lillard, actor and producer
- January 26 – Dan Bobish, mixed martial artist and wrestler
- January 27
  - Dario Brose, soccer player
  - Heather Nauert, journalist and Spokesperson for the United States Department of State (2017-2019)
- January 28
  - James Atkins, football player
  - Andrea Berger, tennis player
- January 29
  - Rob Barrett, death metal musician and guitarist
  - Heather Graham, actress
  - Cary Katz, businessman and poker player
  - Doug Lebda, financial services executive (d. 2025)
  - Paul Ryan, politician, Speaker of the U.S. House of Representatives (2015 to 2019), and 2012 vice presidential candidate
- January 31
  - Joel Bennett, baseball player
  - Minnie Driver, British-born actress

=== February ===
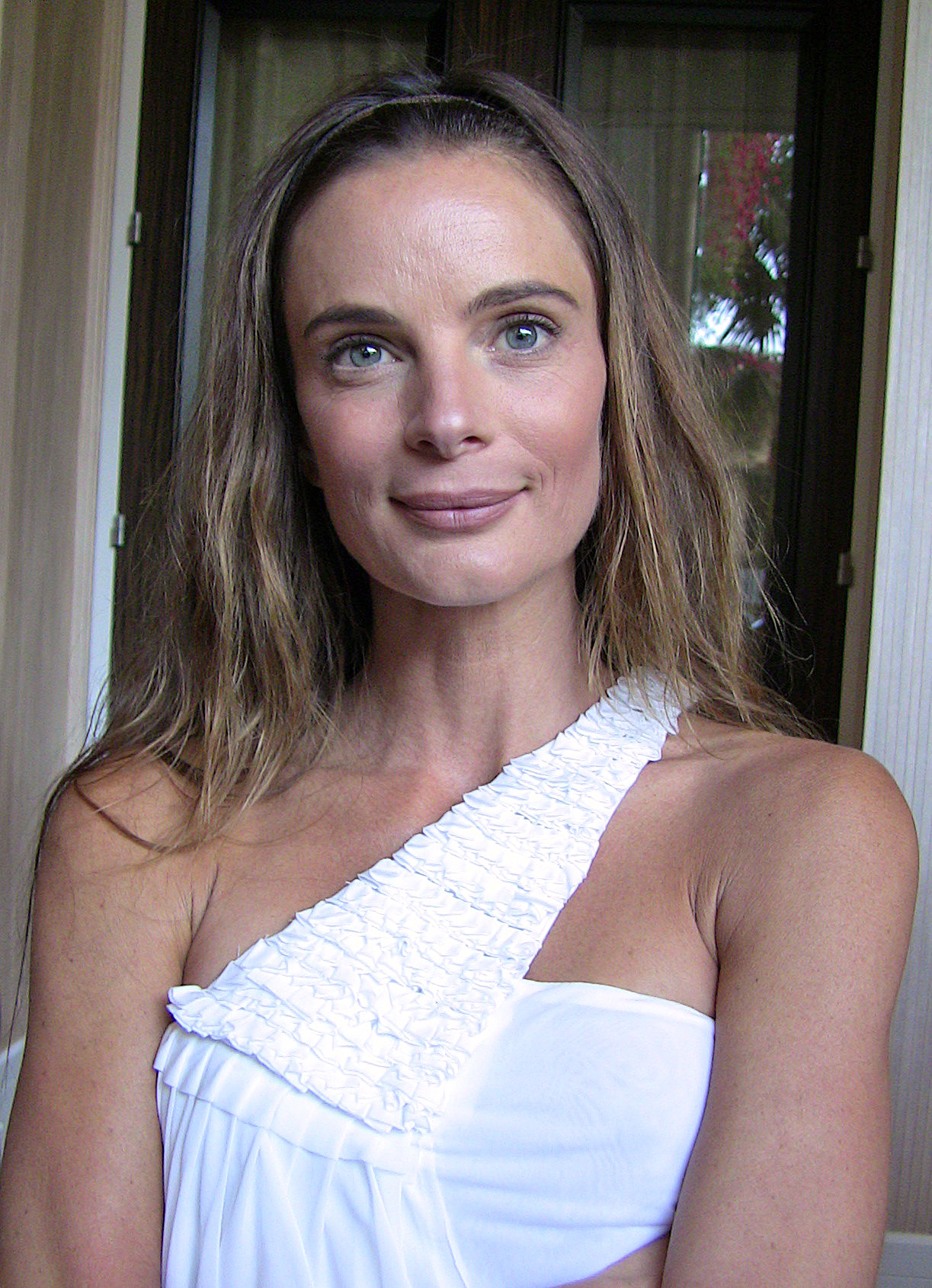
Gabrielle Anwar

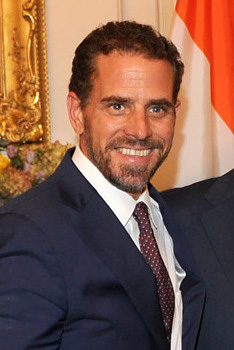
Hunter Biden

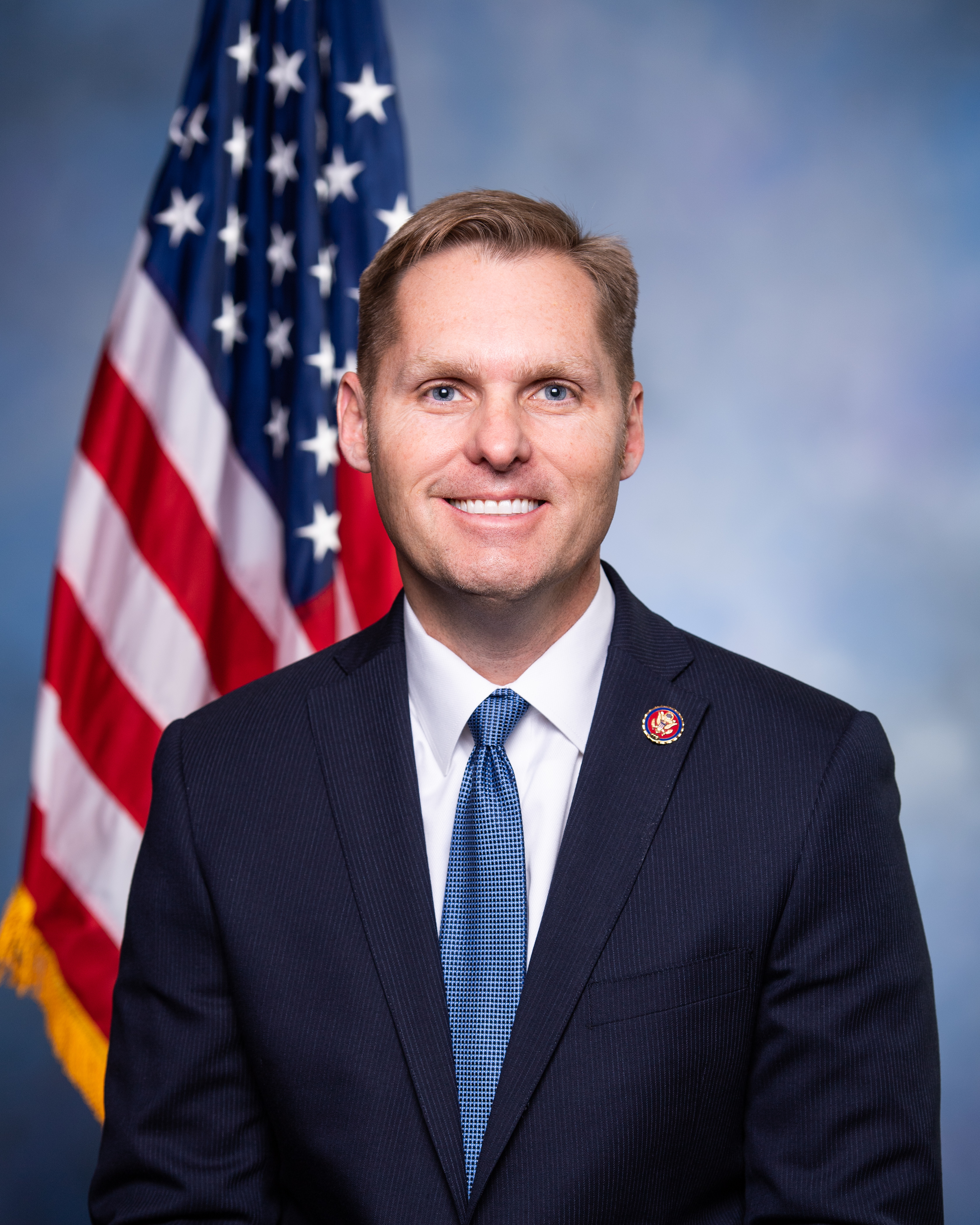
Michael Guest

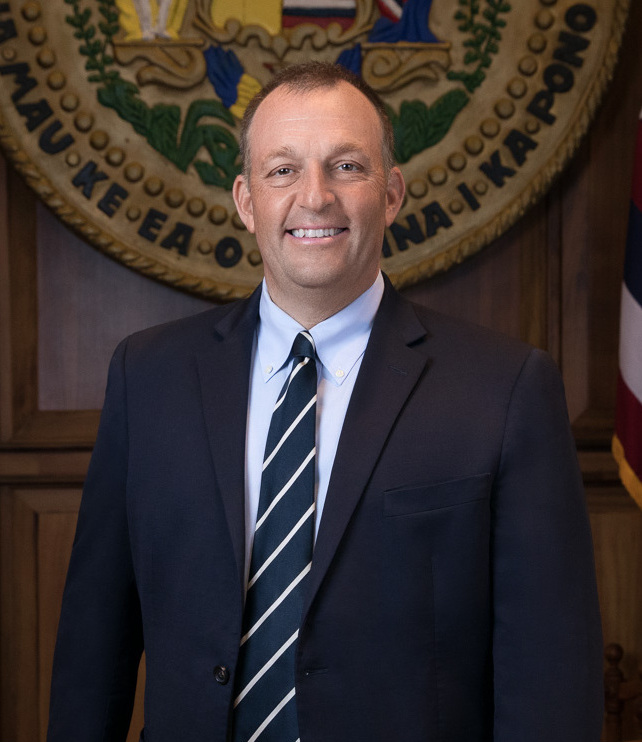
Josh Green

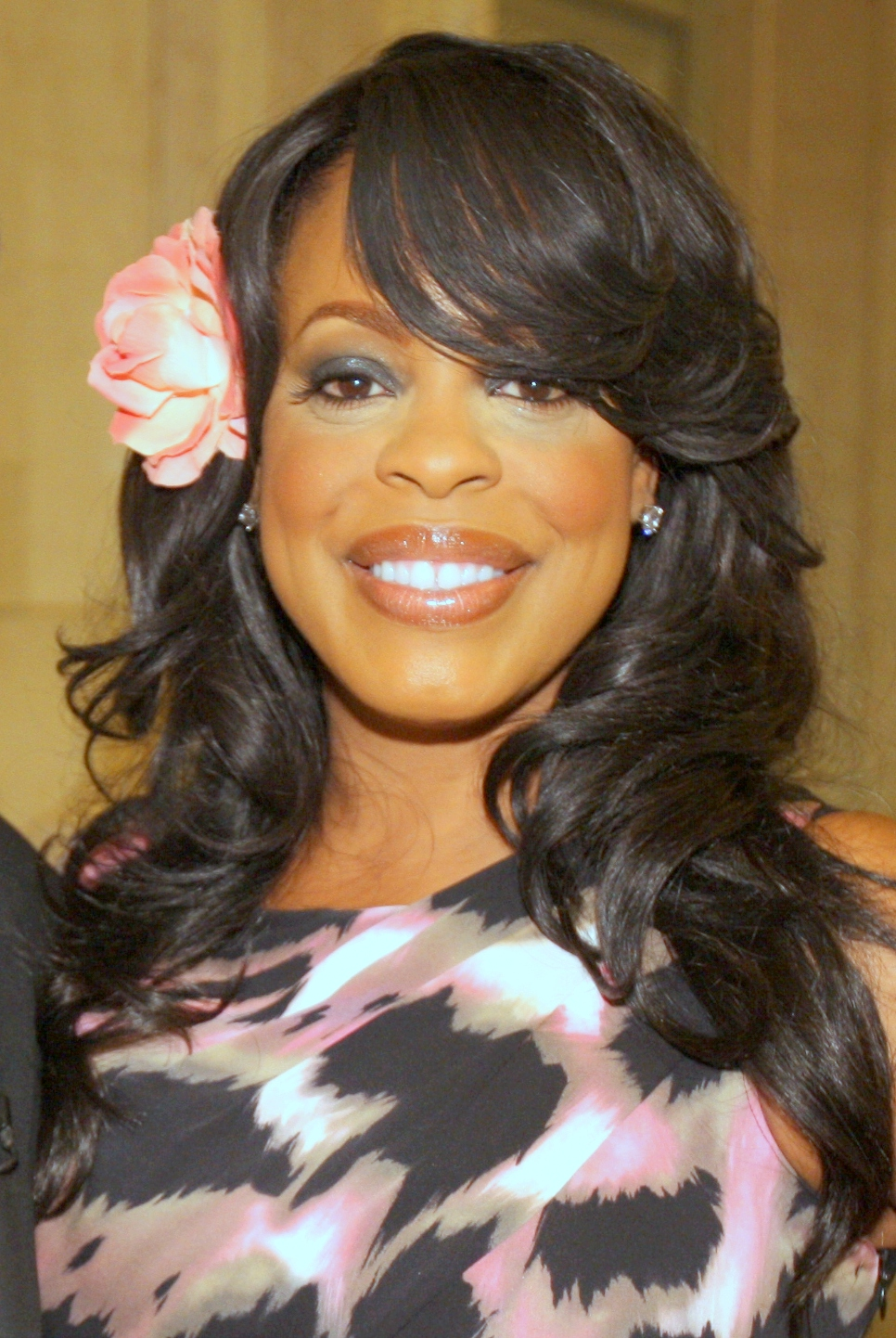
Niecy Nash

- February 1
  - Louis Age, football player
  - Malik Sealy, basketball player (d. 2000)
- February 3
  - Tom Graves, politician and businessman
  - Anthony Russo, director
- February 4
  - Gabrielle Anwar, English-born actress
  - Hunter Biden, son of U.S. President Joe Biden
  - Chris Brandt, filmmaker and cartoonist
  - Rodney Butcher, golfer
  - Jo Jo English, basketball player
  - Michael Guest, politician
- February 5 – Chris Brock, baseball player
- February 6
  - John Bonds, football player
  - Julie Story Byerley, physician
- February 7 – Michael Grimm, politician, U.S. Marine, and convicted felon
- February 8 – Alonzo Mourning, basketball player
- February 9
  - Greg Beals, baseball player and coach
  - Timothy Brenton, murder victim (d. 2009)
  - John Burke, baseball player
  - Todd Rokita, politician
- February 10
  - Sarah Aldrich, actress
  - Jeff Belloli, tennis player
  - Peter Boyer, composer, conductor, and orchestrator
  - Bobby Jones, baseball player
- February 11
  - J. M. Allain, company executive
  - Carl Brown, discus thrower
  - Josh Green, politician, 9th Governor of Hawaii (2022–present)
  - Rob Woodall, politician
- February 12 – Armando Gallop, record producer (d. 1996)
- February 13
  - Elmer Bennett, basketball player
  - Paul Bouche, television host, producer, and comedian
  - Robyn Brody, judge
- February 15
  - Mahnoor Baloch, American-born Canadian actress, director, and model
  - Cameron Beckman, golfer
  - Shepard Fairey, temporary street artist, graphic designer, activist, illustrator, and founder of OBEY
- February 16
  - Kevin Allison, comedian, writer, actor, and storyteller
  - Armand Van Helden, DJ and music producer
- February 17
  - Yari Allnutt, soccer player
  - Tommy Moe, Olympic alpine skier
- February 18
  - Phillip J. Bartell, director, producer, editor, and screenwriter
  - Ari Berman, American-born Israeli rabbi
  - Melvin Bonner, football player
  - Susan Egan, actress, voice actress, singer, and dancer
- February 19
  - Duke Roufus, kickboxer, founder of Roufusport (d. 2025)
  - Bellamy Young, actress, singer and producer
- February 21
  - Juan Barnett, politician
  - Steven Palazzo, politician
  - Chris Rabb, politician, author, and University professor
- February 23 – Niecy Nash, actress
- February 24 – Sonya Anderson, politician
- February 25
  - Joe Bowden, football player and coach
  - Dave Brown, football player
  - Allan Fung, politician, Mayor of Cranston, Rhode Island (2009-2021)
- February 27
  - Rob Adams, actor, acting coach, football player, and football coach
  - Namoli Brennet, singer/songwriter
- February 28 – Daniel Handler, author

=== March ===
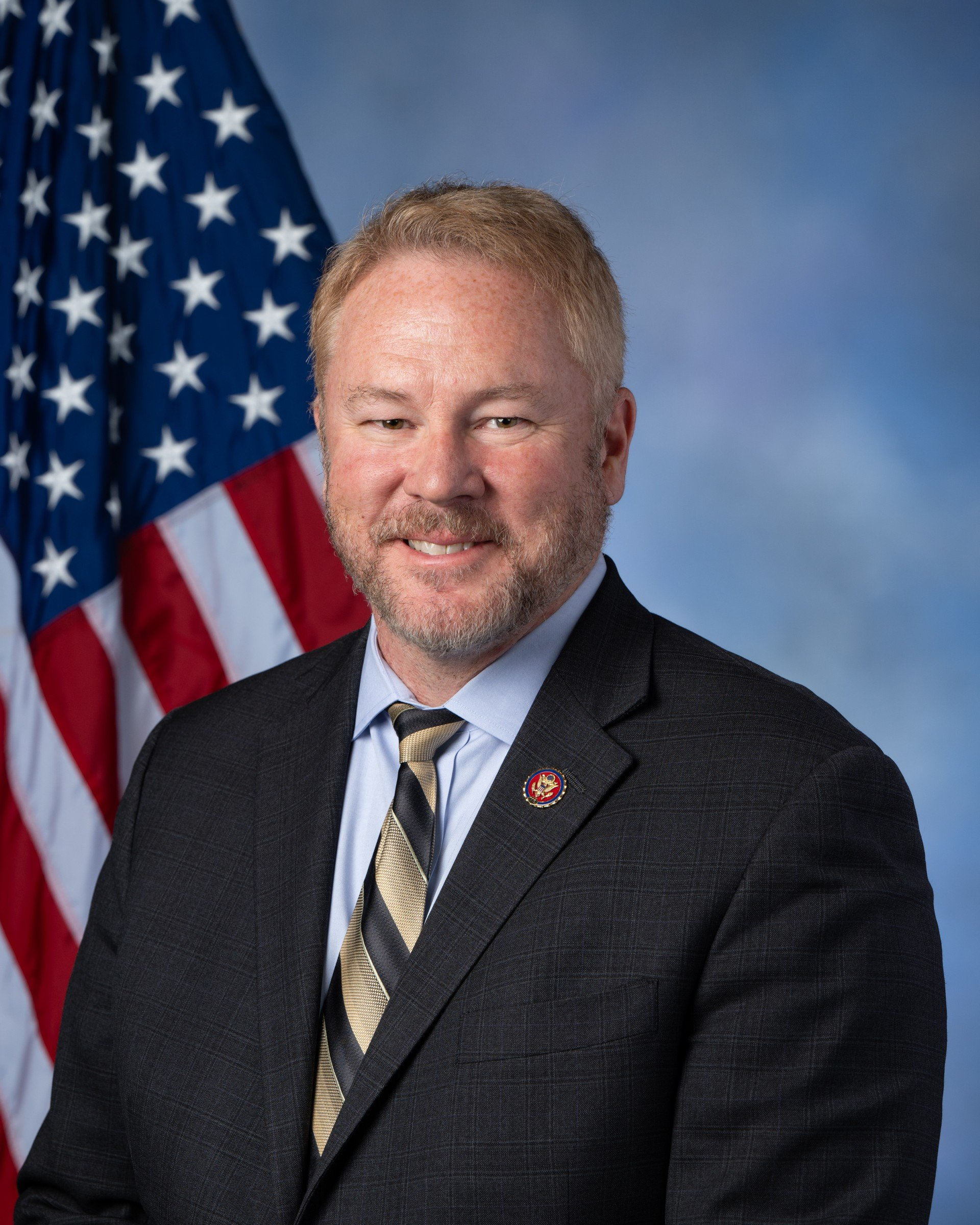
Warren Davidson

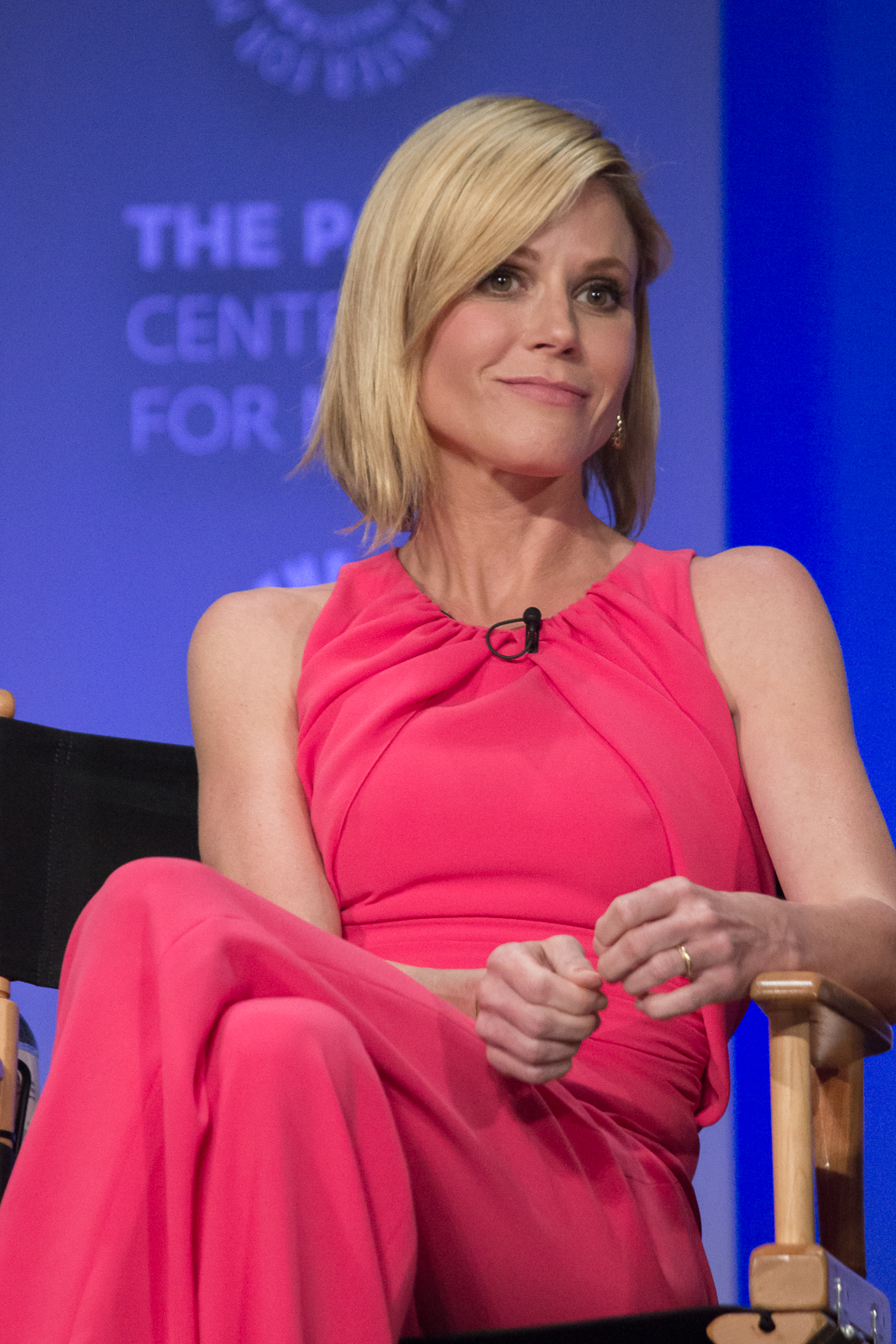
Julie Bowen

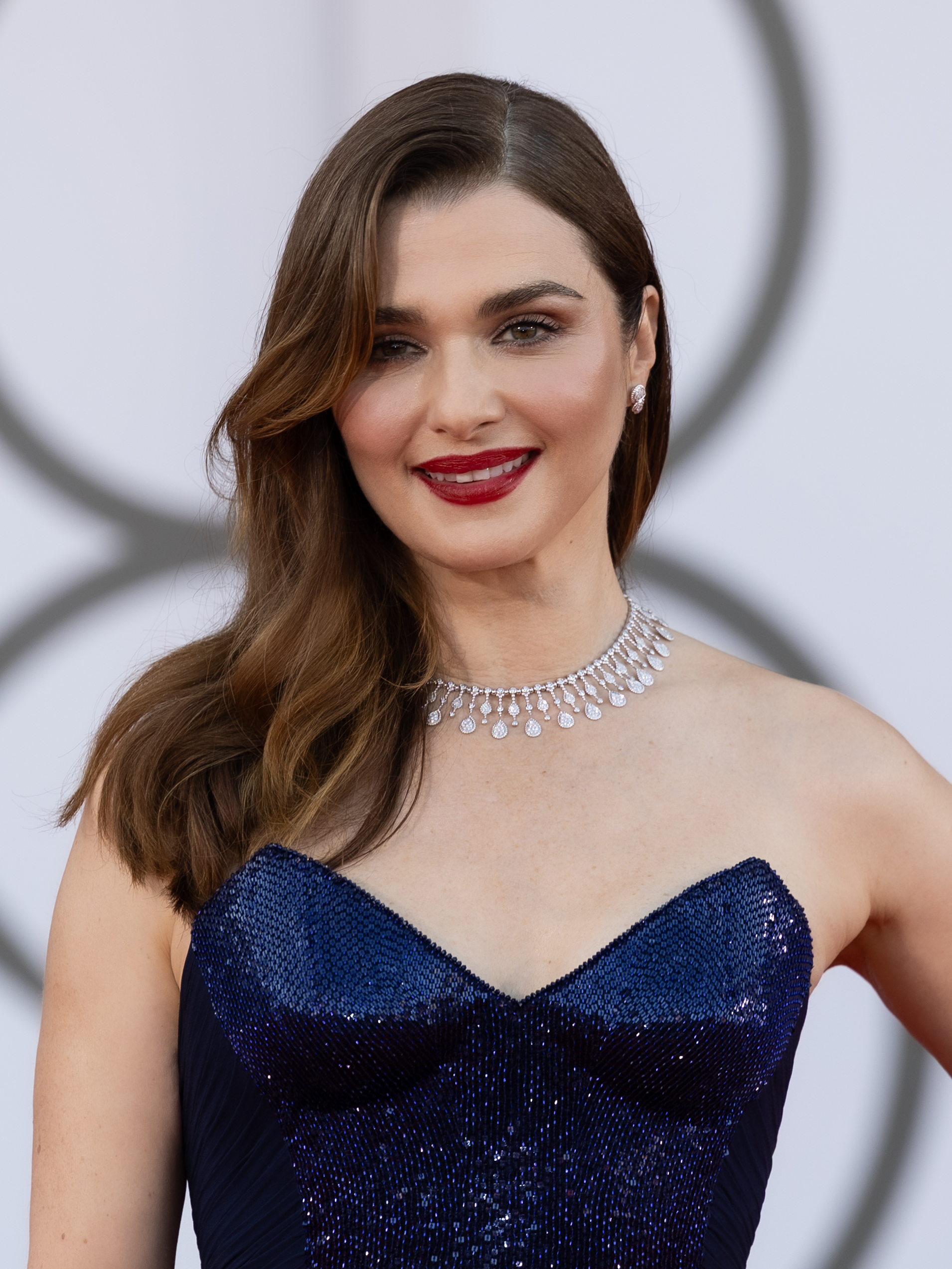
Rachel Weisz

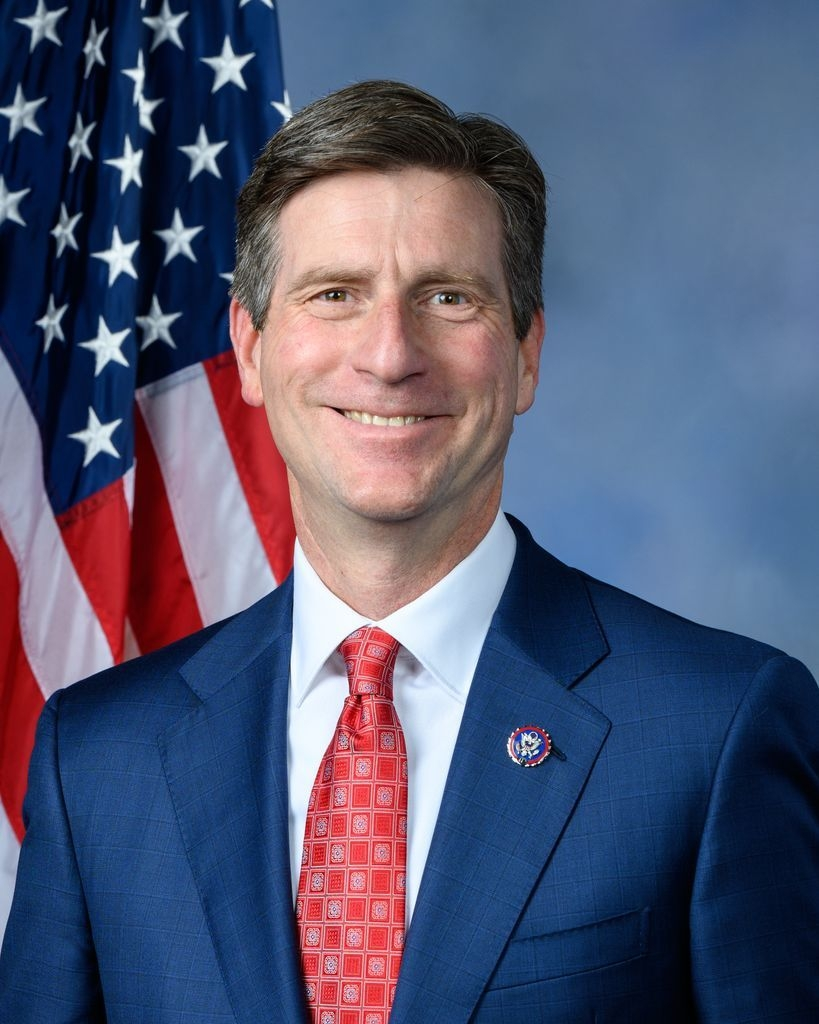
Greg Stanton

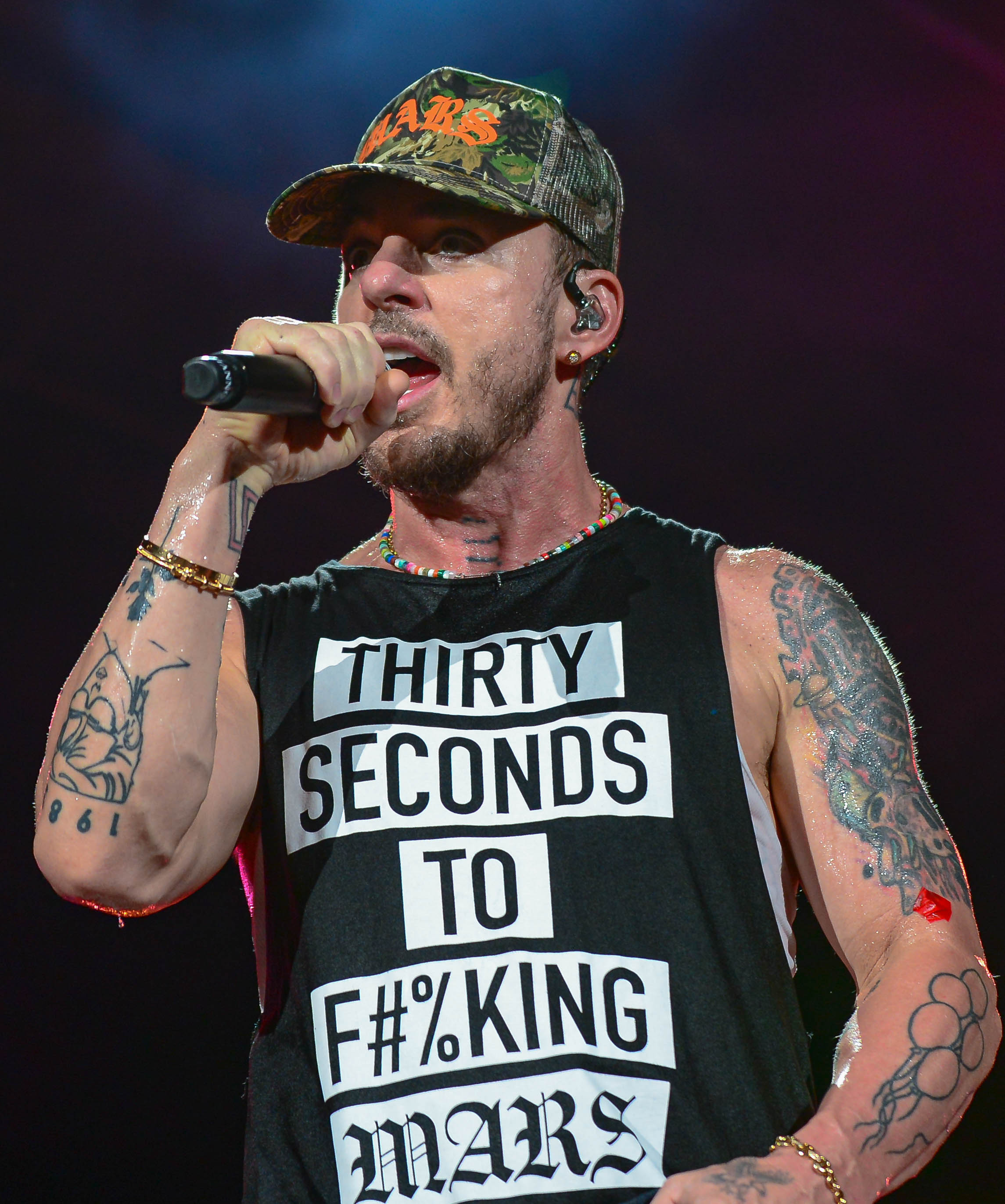
Shannon Leto

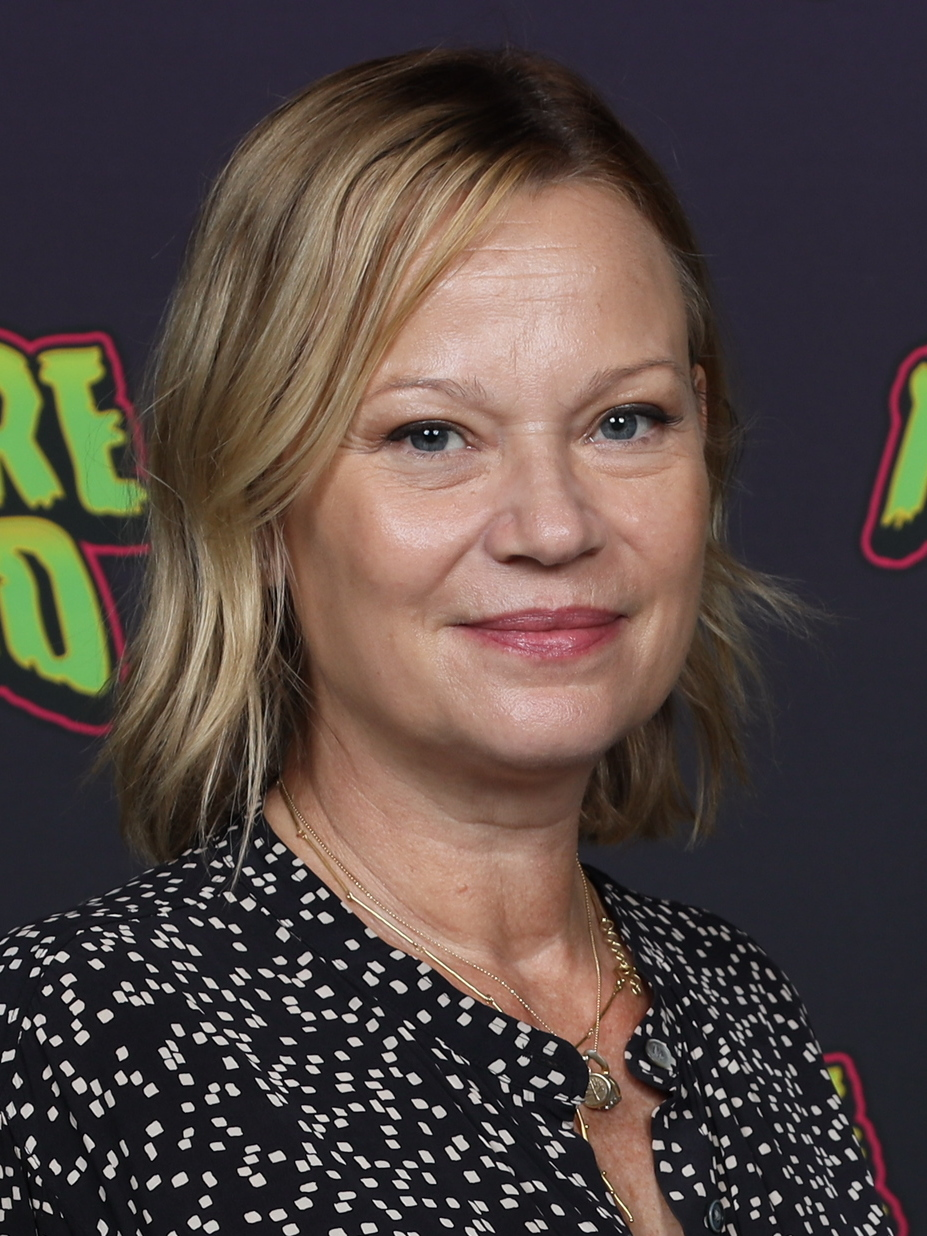
Samantha Mathis

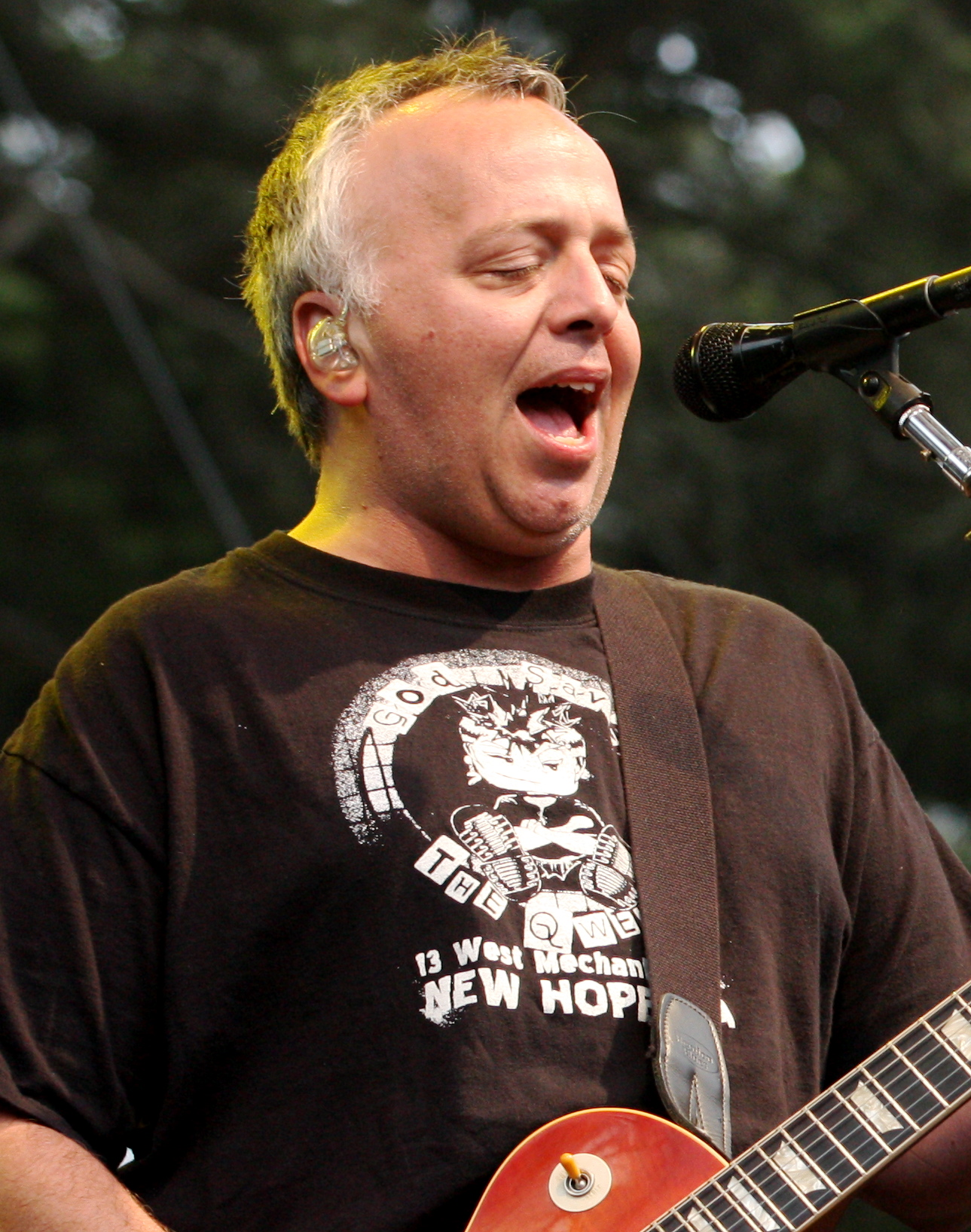
Gene Ween

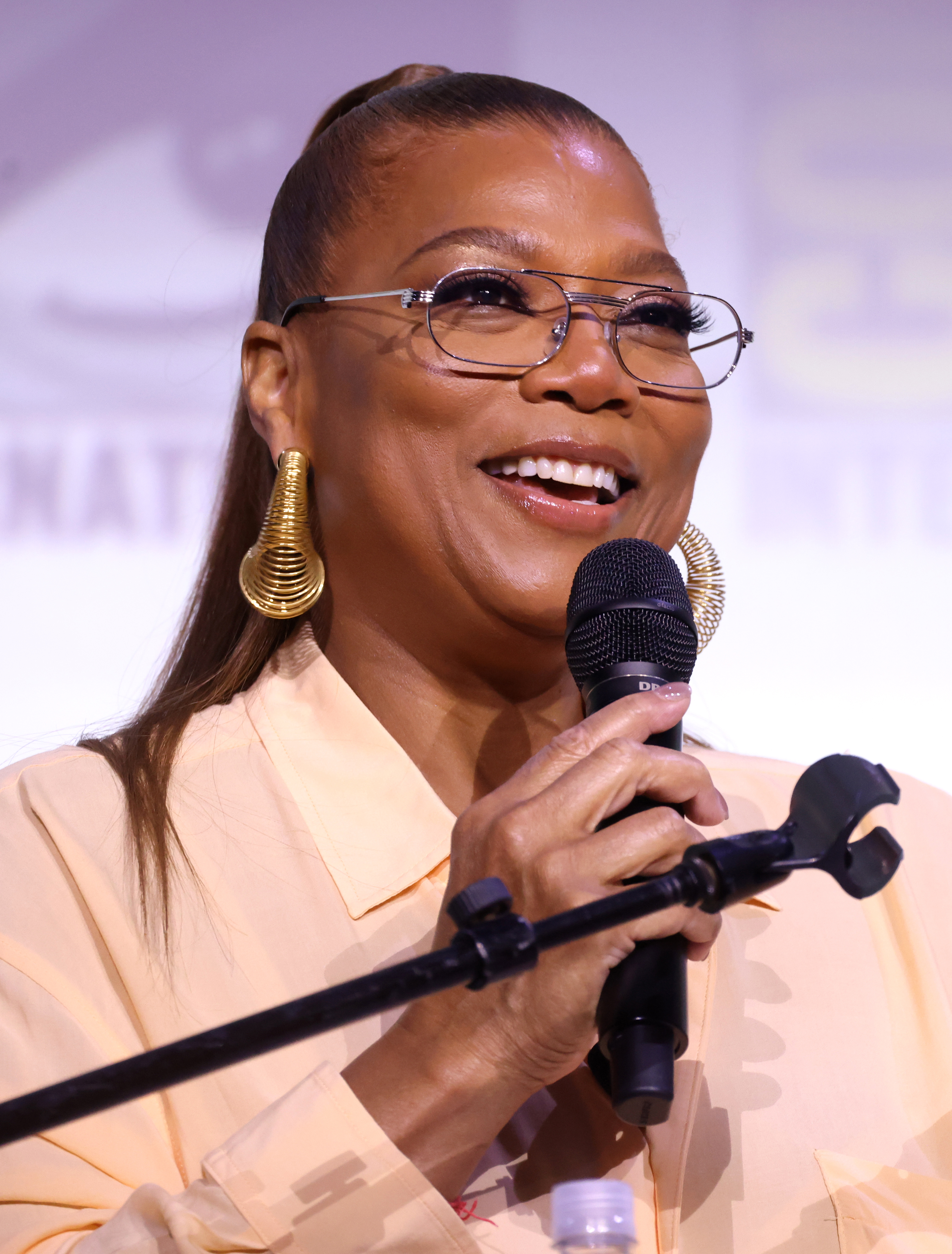
Queen Latifah

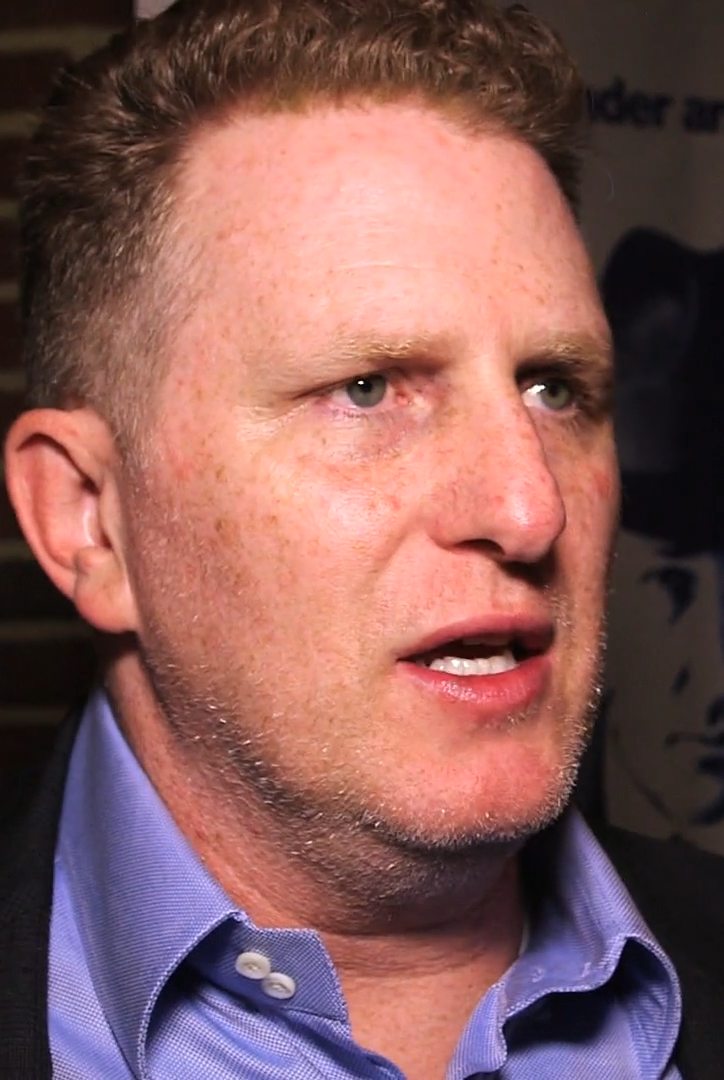
Michael Rapaport

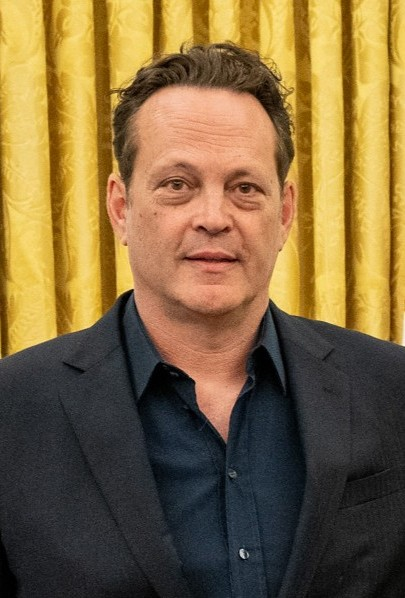
Vince Vaughn

- March 1
  - Jason V. Brock, author, artist, editor, and filmmaker
  - Warren Davidson, politician
- March 3 – Julie Bowen, actress
- March 4 – Matt Barrett, politician
- March 5
  - Laird Barron, author and poet
  - Martin Blackman, tennis player
  - Mike Brown, basketball player and coach
  - John Frusciante, guitarist for the Red Hot Chili Peppers
  - Lisa Robin Kelly, actress (d. 2013)
  - Joel Rudman, politician and physician
  - Paul Whelan, Canadian-born detainee in Russia
- March 6
  - Brian Alvey, entrepreneur, programmer, designer, and blogger
  - Chris Broderick, guitarist for Megadeth (2008-2014) and In Flames
  - Gesine Bullock-Prado, television personality and chef
- March 7
  - Nwando Achebe, Nigerian-born historian
  - Bobby Bonds Jr., baseball player
  - Rachel Weisz, British-born actress
- March 8
  - Jeff Betts, soccer player
  - Michael Bileca, politician
  - Jason Elam, football player
  - Greg Stanton, politician, Mayor of Phoenix, Arizona (2012–2018)
- March 9 – Shannon Leto, drummer for 30 Seconds to Mars
- March 10
  - Tomas Barrientes, boxer
  - Antonio Edwards, football player
- March 12
  - Michael Bankston, football player
  - Eef Barzelay, Israeli-born singer/songwriter
  - John Nemechek, race car driver (d. 1997)
  - Troy Winbush, actor
- March 13
  - Michael Arrington, businessman, founder of TechCrunch
  - Mark Bavis, ice hockey player and 9/11 victim (d. 2001)
  - Jonathan Bing, attorney and politician
  - Tim Story, director, writer, and producer
- March 14
  - Tom Allen, football coach
  - Kristian Bush, singer/songwriter and record producer
  - Meredith Salenger, actress
- March 15 – Mike Haridopolos, politician
- March 17
  - Andy Blankenbuehler, dancer, choreographer, and director
  - Denver Riggleman, politician
  - Yanic Truesdale, Canadian-born actor
  - Gene Ween, singer, guitarist, and frontman for Ween
- March 18 – Queen Latifah, actress and rapper
- March 19
  - Steve Bechtel, rock climber and coach
  - Steve Light, children's book author and illustrator
- March 20
  - Robert Arp, philosopher
  - Edoardo Ballerini, actor, narrator, writer, and director
  - Will Brunson, baseball player (d. 2019)
  - Todd Burger, football player
  - Michele Jaffe, novelist
  - Linda Larkin, actress and voice actress
  - Michael Rapaport, actor
- March 21
  - Lee Bright, politician
  - Cenk Uygur, Turkish-born political commentator, activist, and attorney
- March 22 – Blaine E. Brownell, architect, author, and educator
- March 23
  - Beau Flynn, producer
  - Kate Jennings Grant, actress
- March 24
  - Lisa Albano, tennis player
  - Lara Flynn Boyle, actress
  - Marques Bragg, basketball player
  - Jeff Lewis, television personality and real estate speculator
- March 25 – Antoine Bello, American-born French author
- March 26
  - Gary Byron, politician
  - Justin Meldal-Johnsen, songwriter
- March 27
  - Jeff Brown, judge
  - Elizabeth Mitchell, actress
- March 28
  - Sheri Biggs, politician and Air Force Lt. Colonel
  - Vince Vaughn, actor, writer, and producer
- March 29 – Richard Irvin, lawyer, politician, and the mayor of Aurora, Illinois
- March 30
  - Jeff Antebi, entrepreneur
  - Marc Erwin Babej, German-born photographic artist and writer
  - Shane Bertsch, golfer
  - Secretariat, thoroughbred racehorse (d. 1989)
- March 31
  - Andrew Baron, Internet personality and founder of Rocketboom
  - Derek Brown, football player
  - Samantha Brown, television host

=== April ===
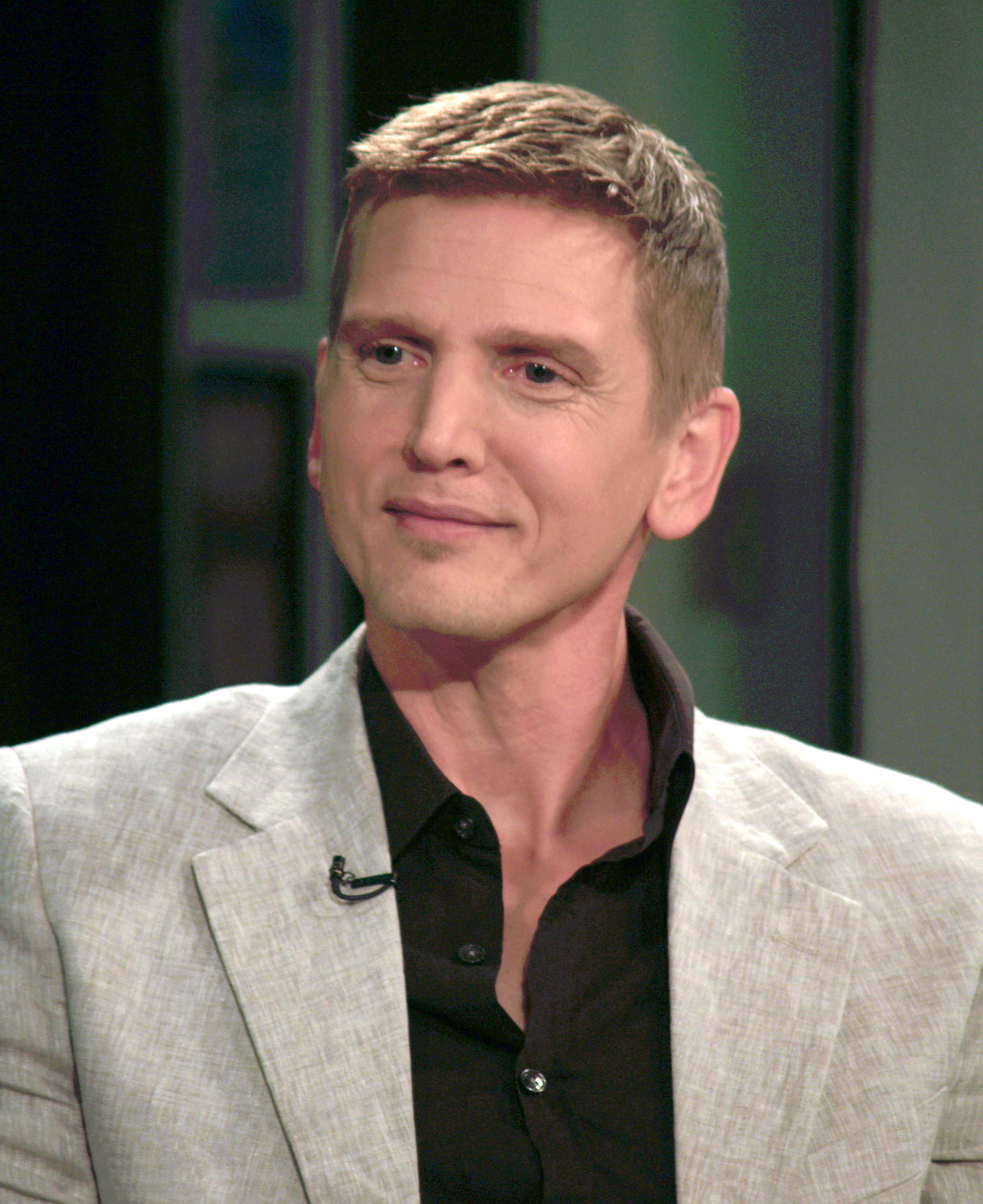
Barry Pepper

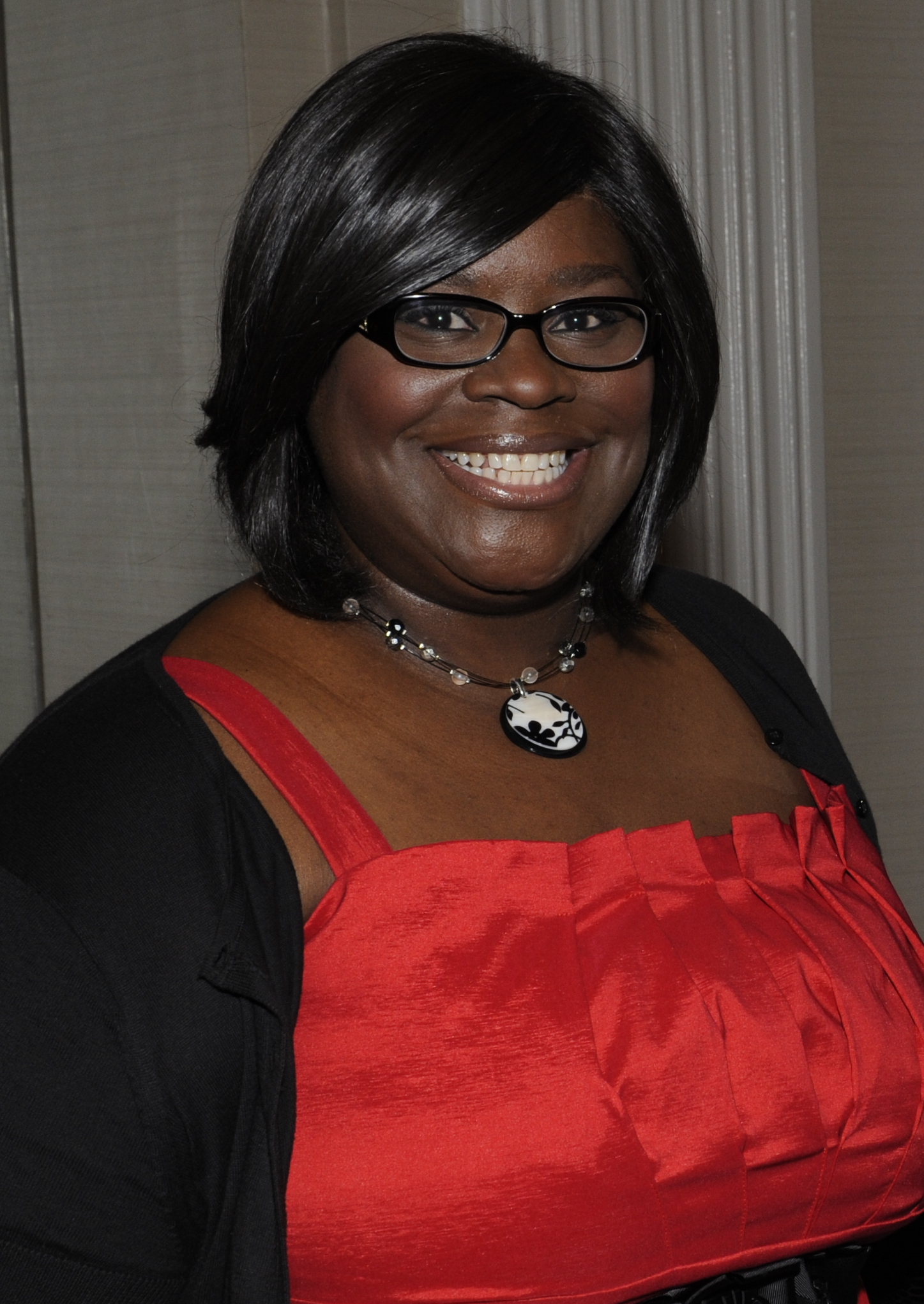
Retta

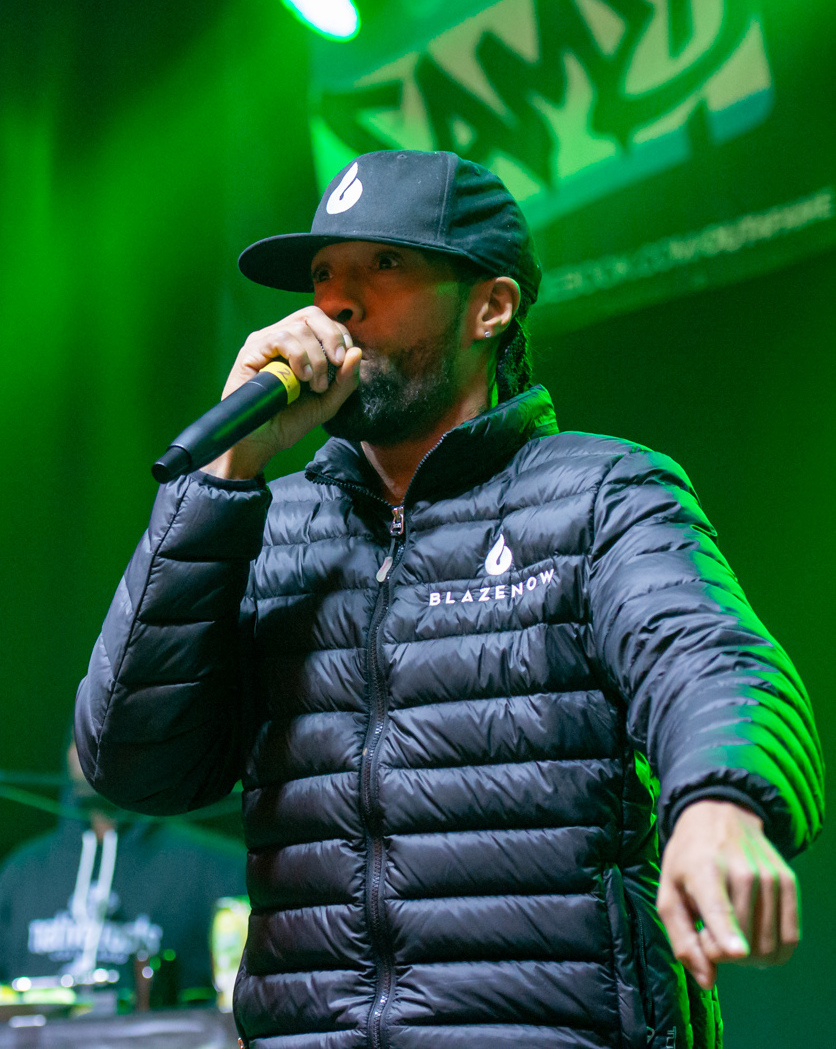
Redman

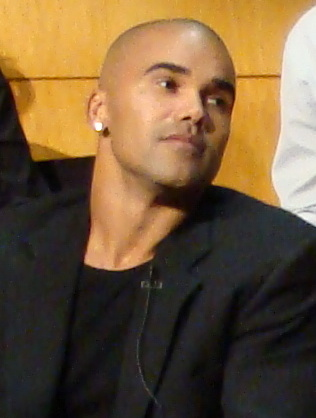
Shemar Moore

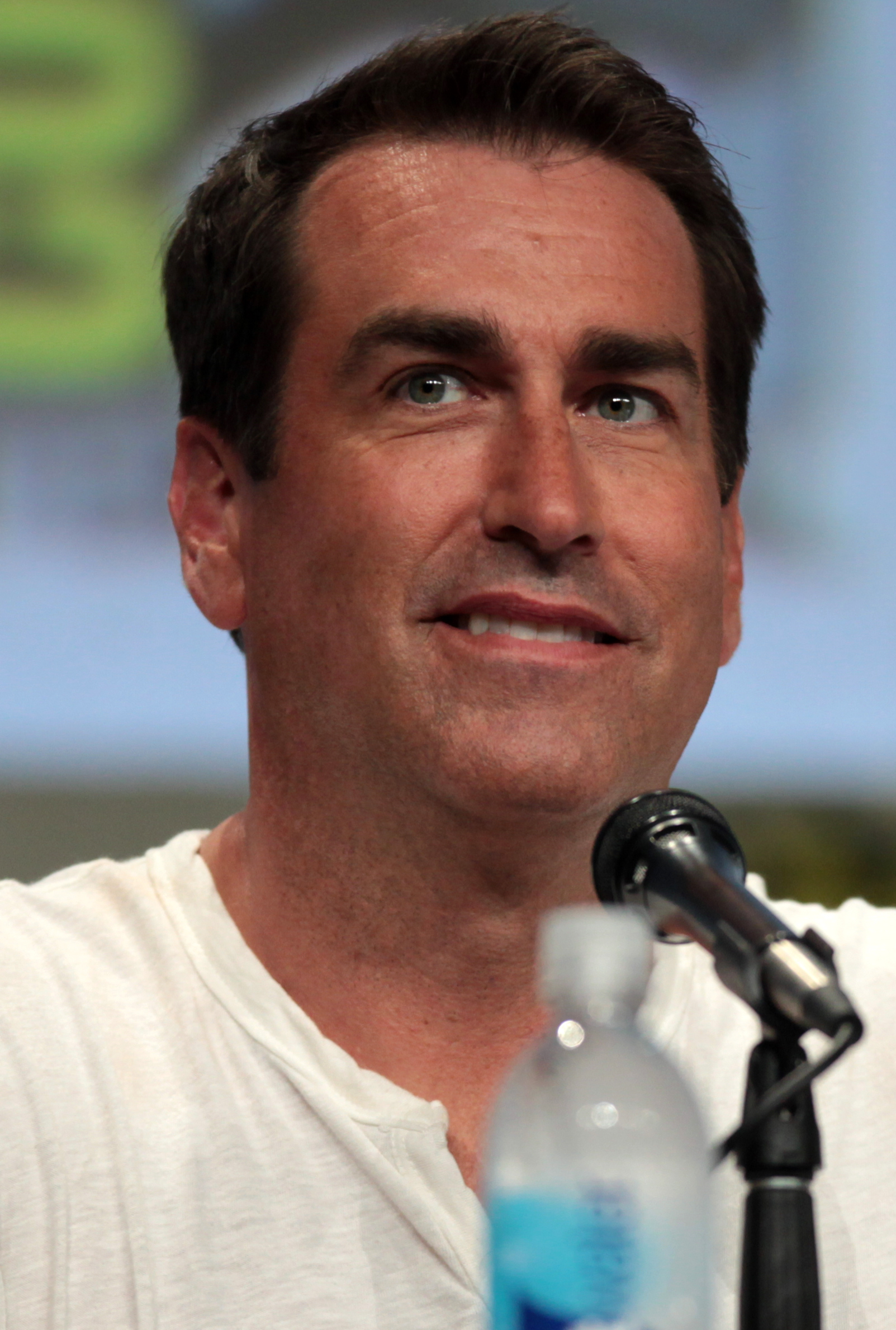
Rob Riggle

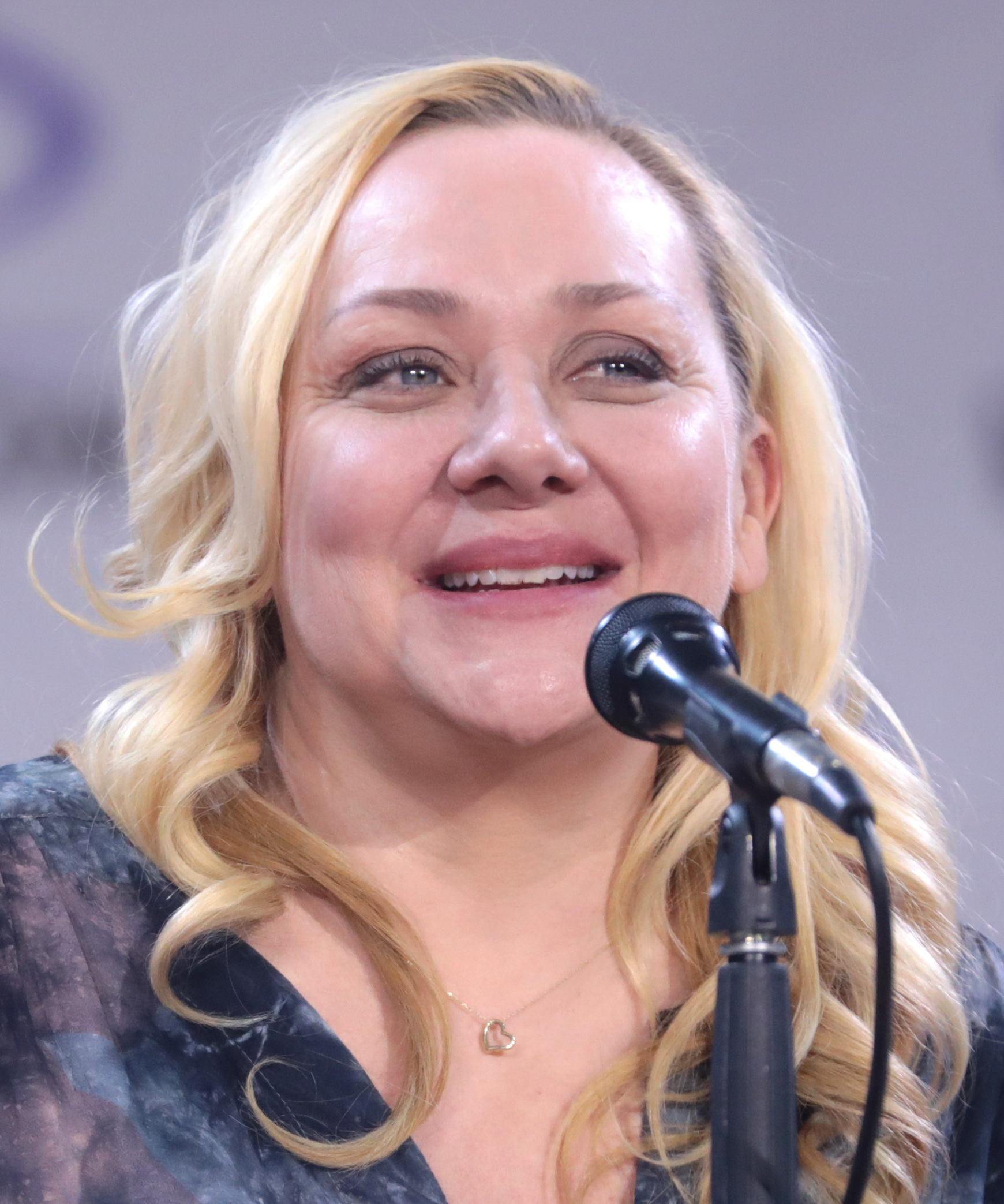
Nicole Sullivan

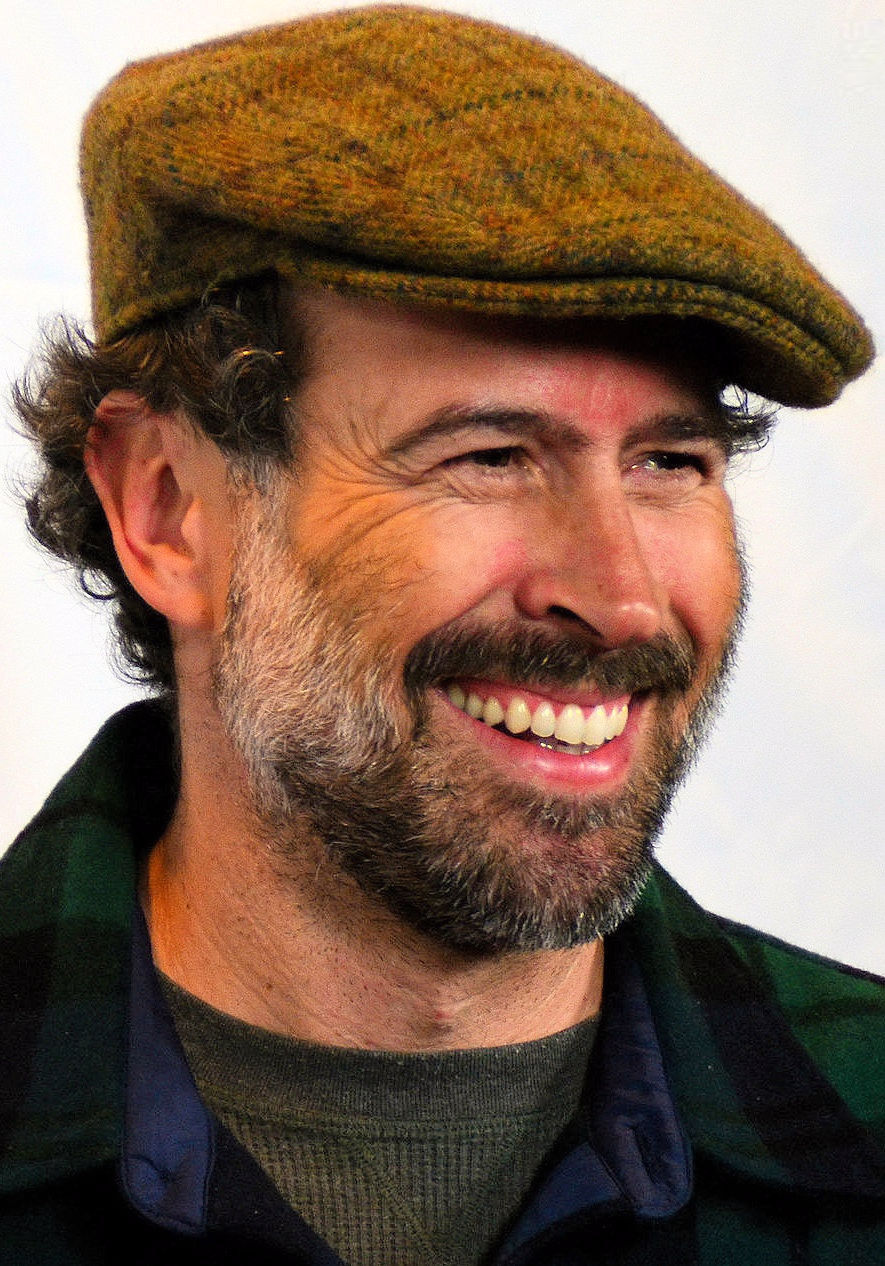
Jason Lee

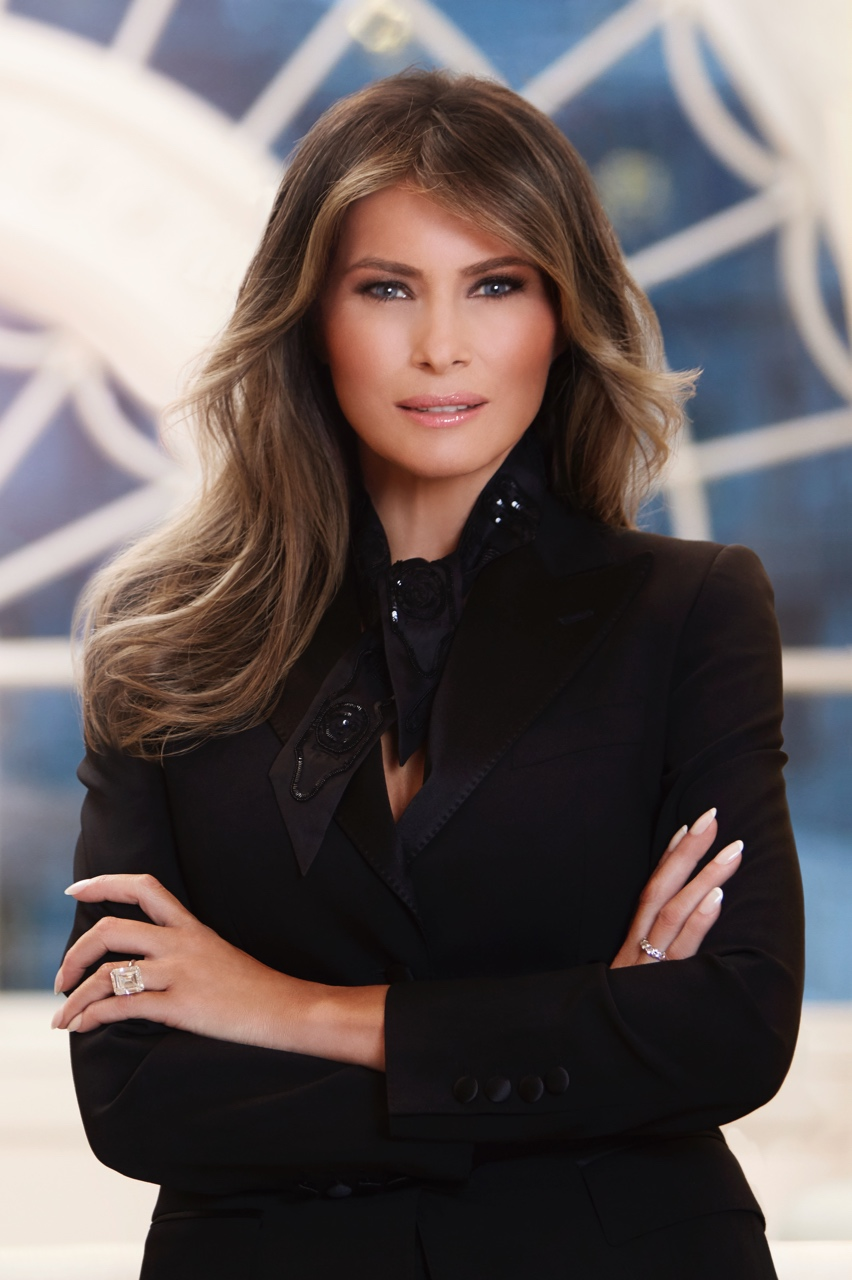
Melania Trump

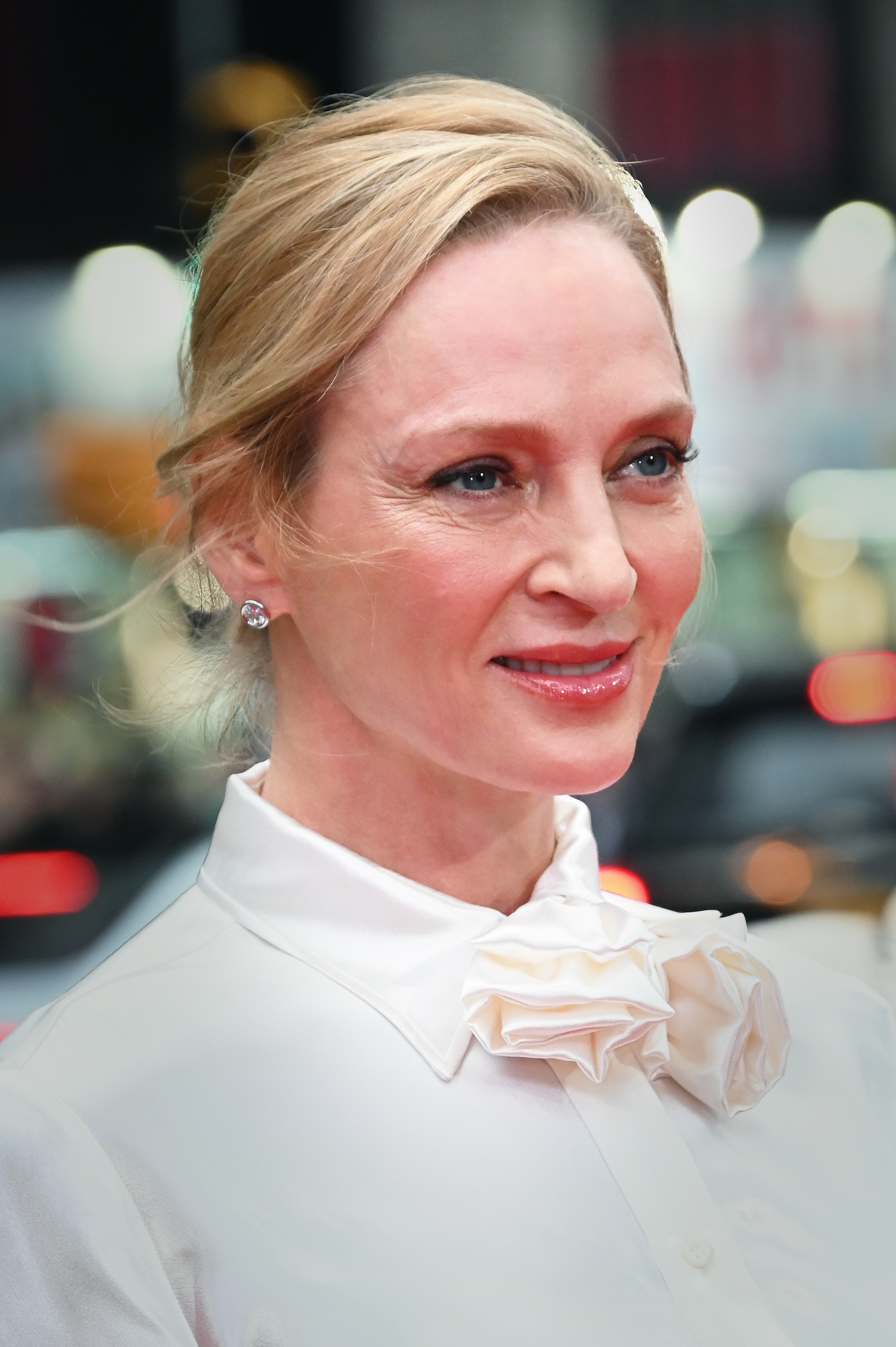
Uma Thurman

- April 1
  - Wes Barnett, Olympic weightlifter
  - Wes Bender, football player (d. 2018)
  - Chris Brogan, author, journalist, marketing consultant, and speaker
  - Mark Wheeler, football player
- April 4
  - Janice Kawaye, actress and voice actress
  - Barry Pepper, Canadian-born actor
  - Tom Wiscombe, architect
- April 6
  - Tim Belk, baseball player
  - Oliver Miller, basketball player (d. 2025)
- April 7 – Matt Anoaʻi, wrestler (d. 2017)
- April 8
  - Harold Bishop, football player
  - Will Bond, politician
  - JR Bourne, actor
  - Derek Brown, Olympic handballer
- April 9
  - Chris Apple, soccer player and coach
  - Corey L. Banks, rapper and songwriter
  - Ras Baraka, educator, author, and politician, mayor of Newark, New Jersey (2014–present)
  - Mike Barz, broadcaster and news anchor
  - Chuck Bradley, football player
- April 10
  - Deb Andraca, politician
  - Scott Brody, soccer player and coach
  - Sean Gilbert, football player and coach
  - Kenny Lattimore, Contemporary R&B singer
  - Q-Tip, musician and actor
- April 11
  - Sean Bergman, baseball player
  - K. C. Boutiette, Olympic speed skater
  - Dylan Keefe, bassist for Marcy Playground
- April 12 – Retta, actress and comedian
- April 13
  - Monty Brown, wrestler and football player
  - Timothy Linh Bui, Vietnamese-born filmmaker
  - Mike Ford, NASCAR crew chief
  - Ricky Schroder, actor
- April 14
  - Steve Avery, baseball player
  - Sibi Blazic, stunt performer and driver
- April 15 – Flex Alexander, actor
- April 16 – Sam Liccardo, politician, mayor of San Jose, California (2015-2023)
- April 17 – Redman, rapper and actor
- April 18
  - Rico Brogna, baseball player and coach
  - Greg Eklund. drummer and vocalist for Everclear
  - Shannon Hall, boxer, wrestler, and bodybuilder
- April 19
  - Michael Barrow, football player and coach
  - Tiny Bubz, drummer
- April 20 – Shemar Moore, actor
- April 21
  - Jeff Anderson, actor, director, and screenwriter
  - Doug Barrault, Canadian-born ice hockey player
  - Rob Riggle, actor and comedian
  - Nicole Sullivan, actress, comedian, and voice artist
- April 22
  - Paulie Ayala, boxer
  - Coleman Bell, football player
- April 23 – Ryan Benjami, football player
- April 24 – Brian Gamble, martial artist and wrestler
- April 25
  - George Baker, art historian
  - Corwin Brown, football player and coach
  - Jason Lee, actor, comedian, and skateboarder
- April 26
  - Steve Breen, cartoonist
  - Melania Trump, Slovenian-born model, businesswoman, and First Lady of the United States (2017–2021, 2025–present)
  - Tionne Watkins, actress and singer/songwriter, member of TLC
- April 27
  - Dexter Boney, basketball player
  - Earnest Brown Jr., lawyer and University professor
- April 28 – Eric Bachmann, multi-instrumentalist, songwriter, producer, and frontman for Archers of Loaf and Crooked Fingers
- April 29
  - Andre Agassi, tennis player
  - John C. Atkins, politician
  - Uma Thurman, actress
- April 30
  - Ralph Alvarado, physician and politician
  - Wayne Baker Brooks, blues guitarist and singer

=== May ===
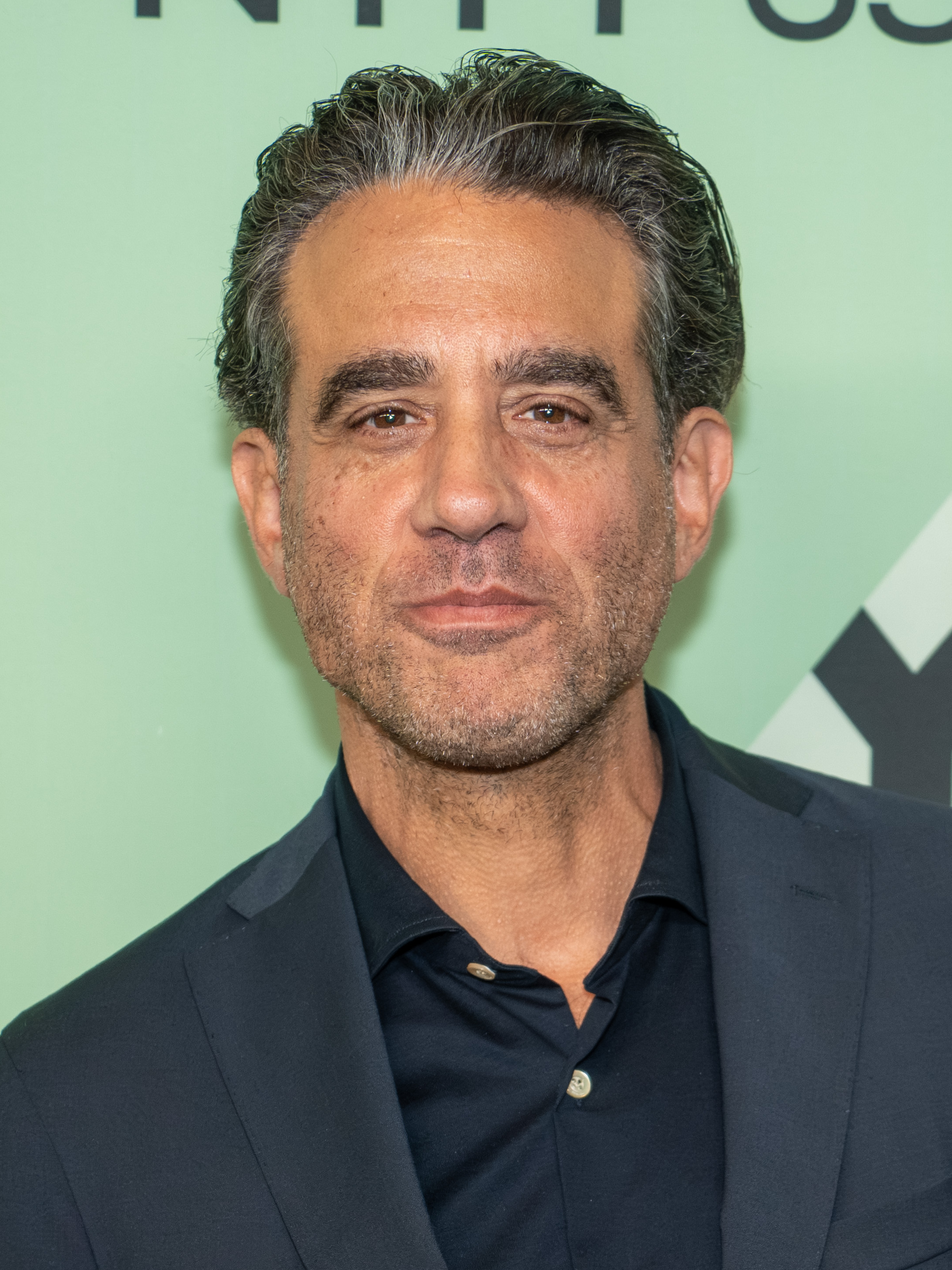
Bobby Cannavale

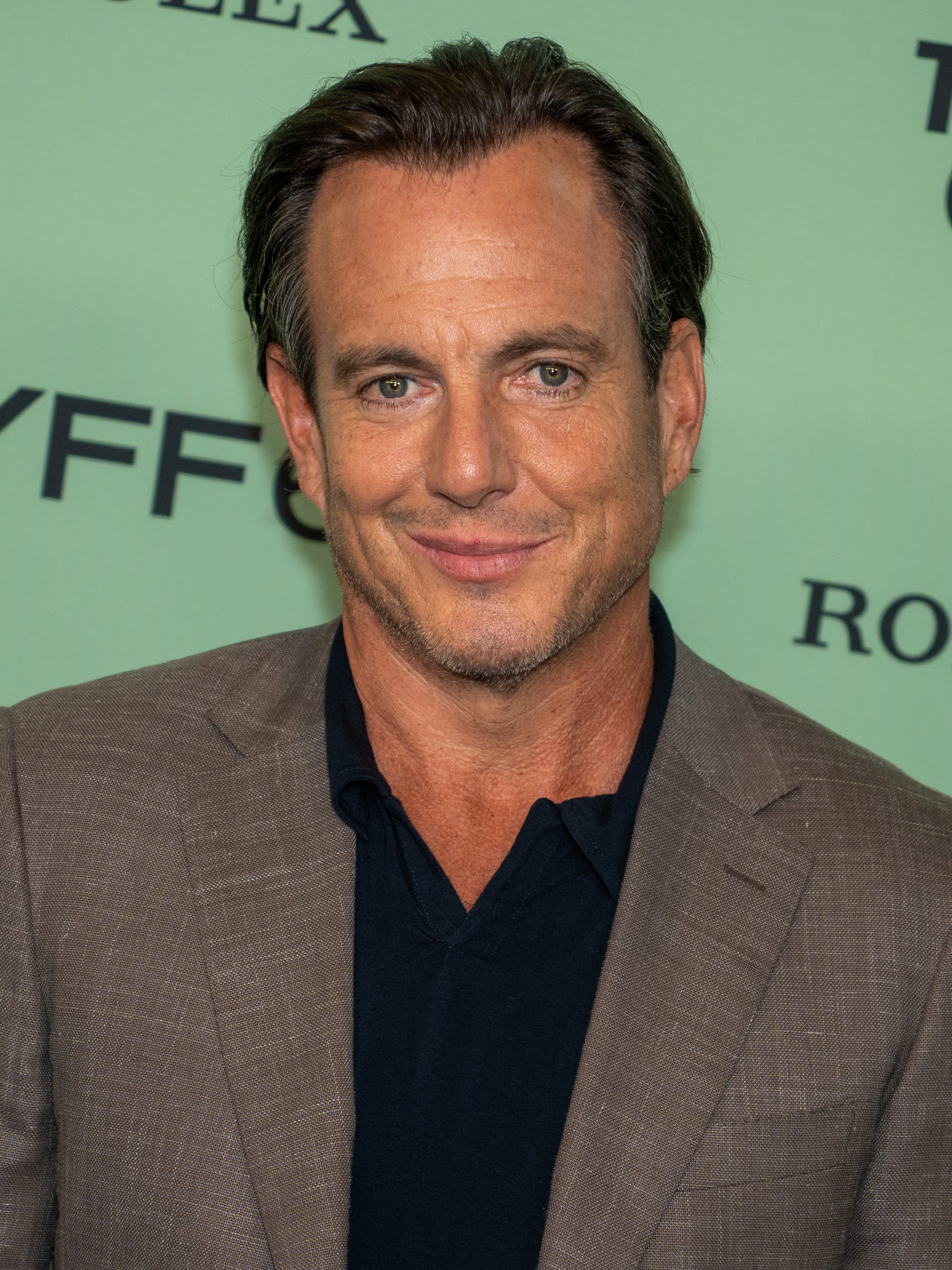
Will Arnett

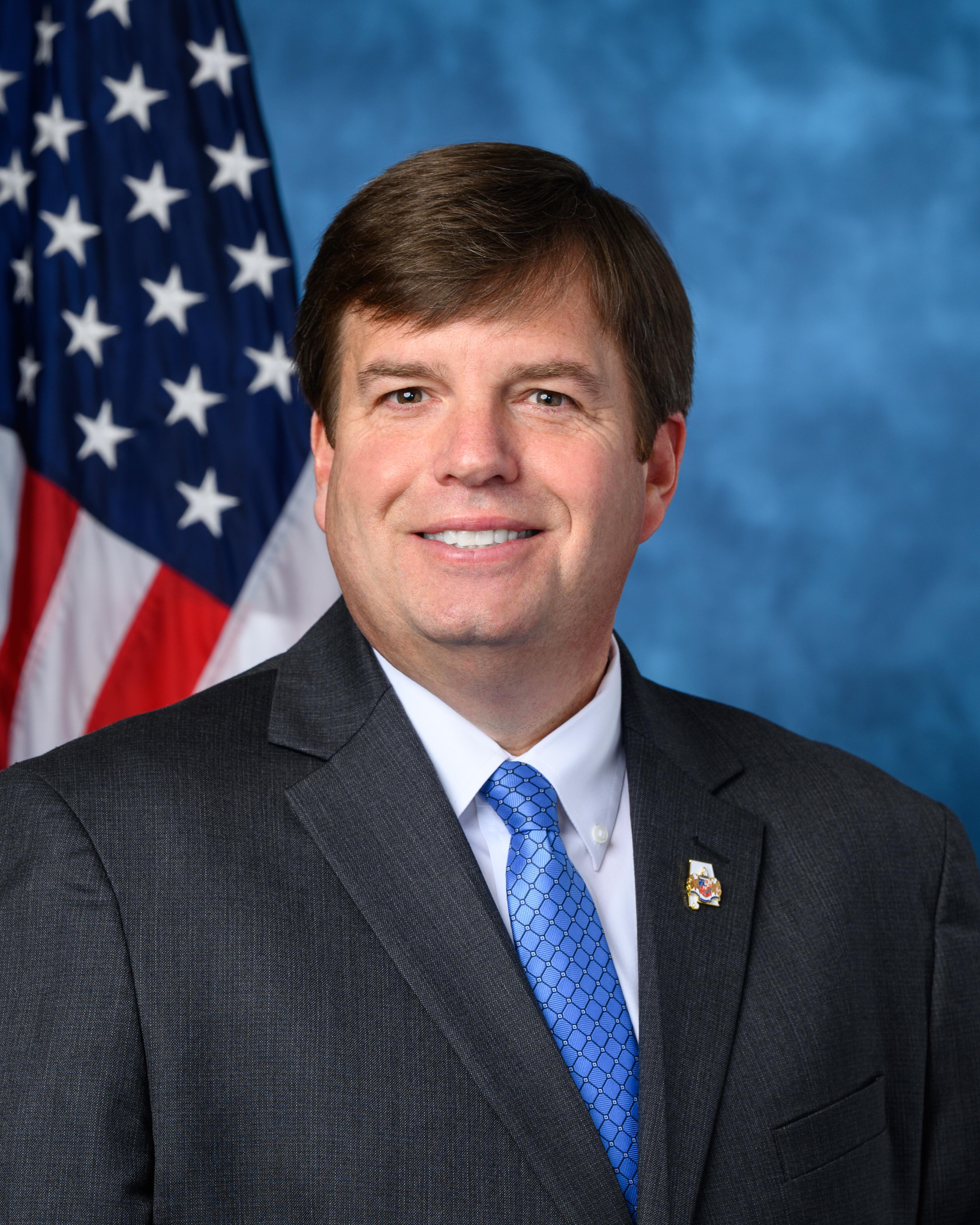
Dale Strong

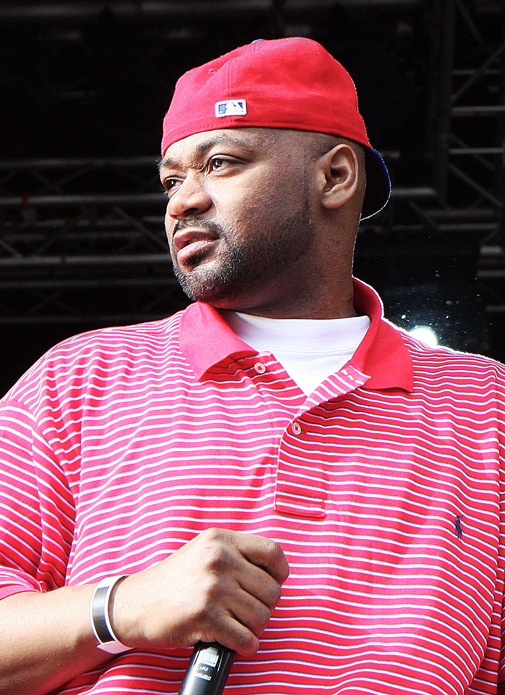
Ghostface Killah

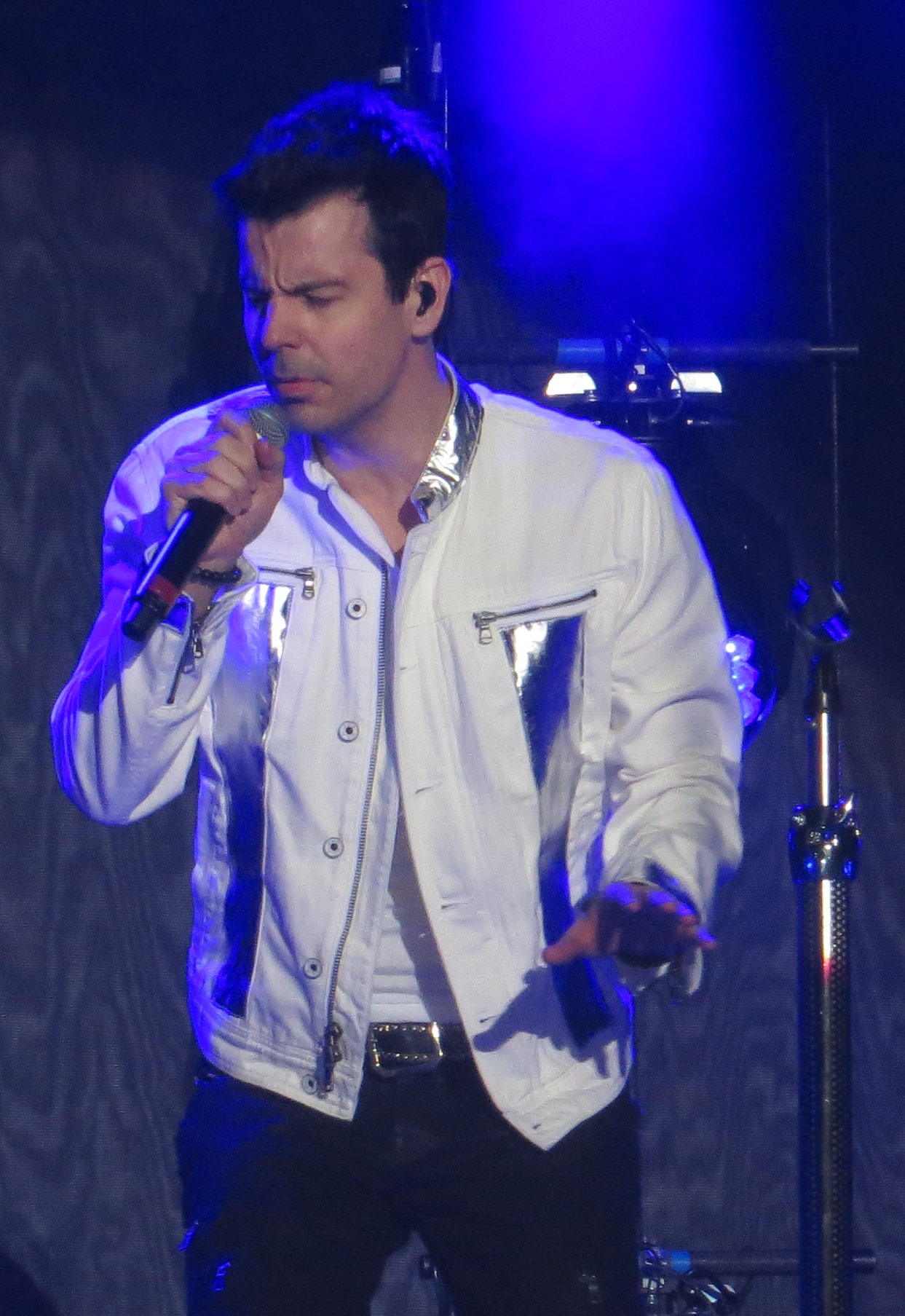
Jordan Knight

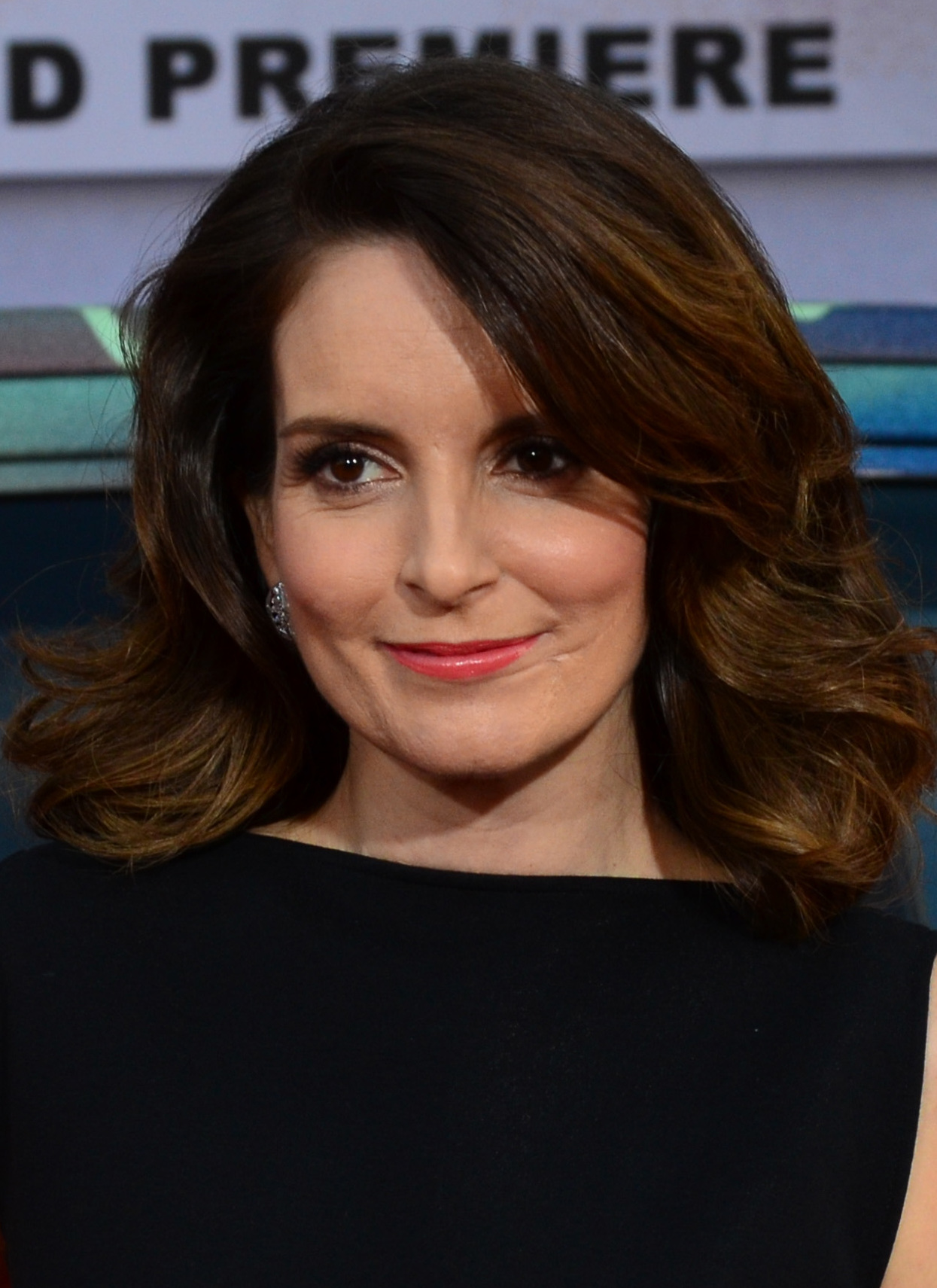
Tina Fey

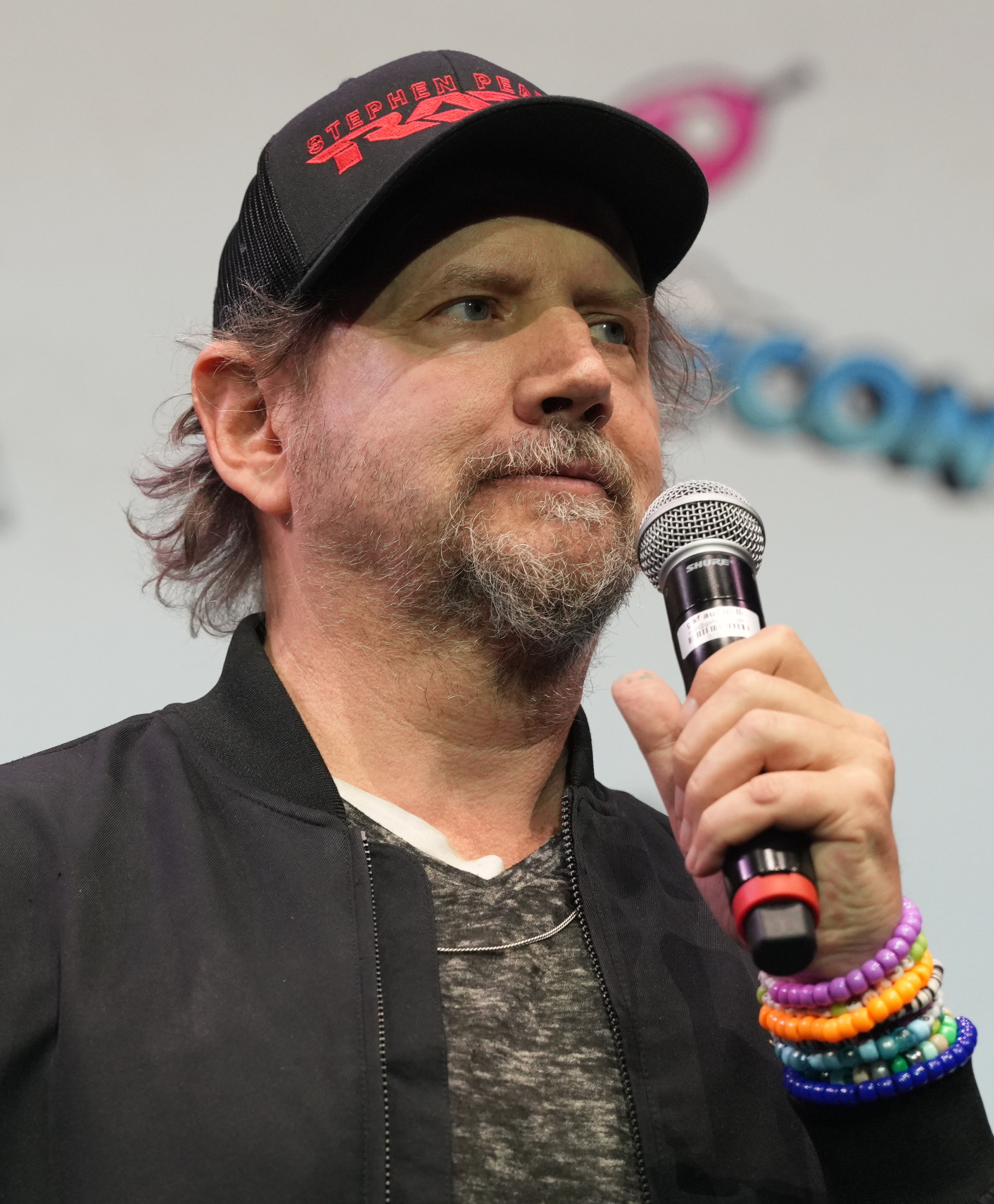
Jamie Kennedy

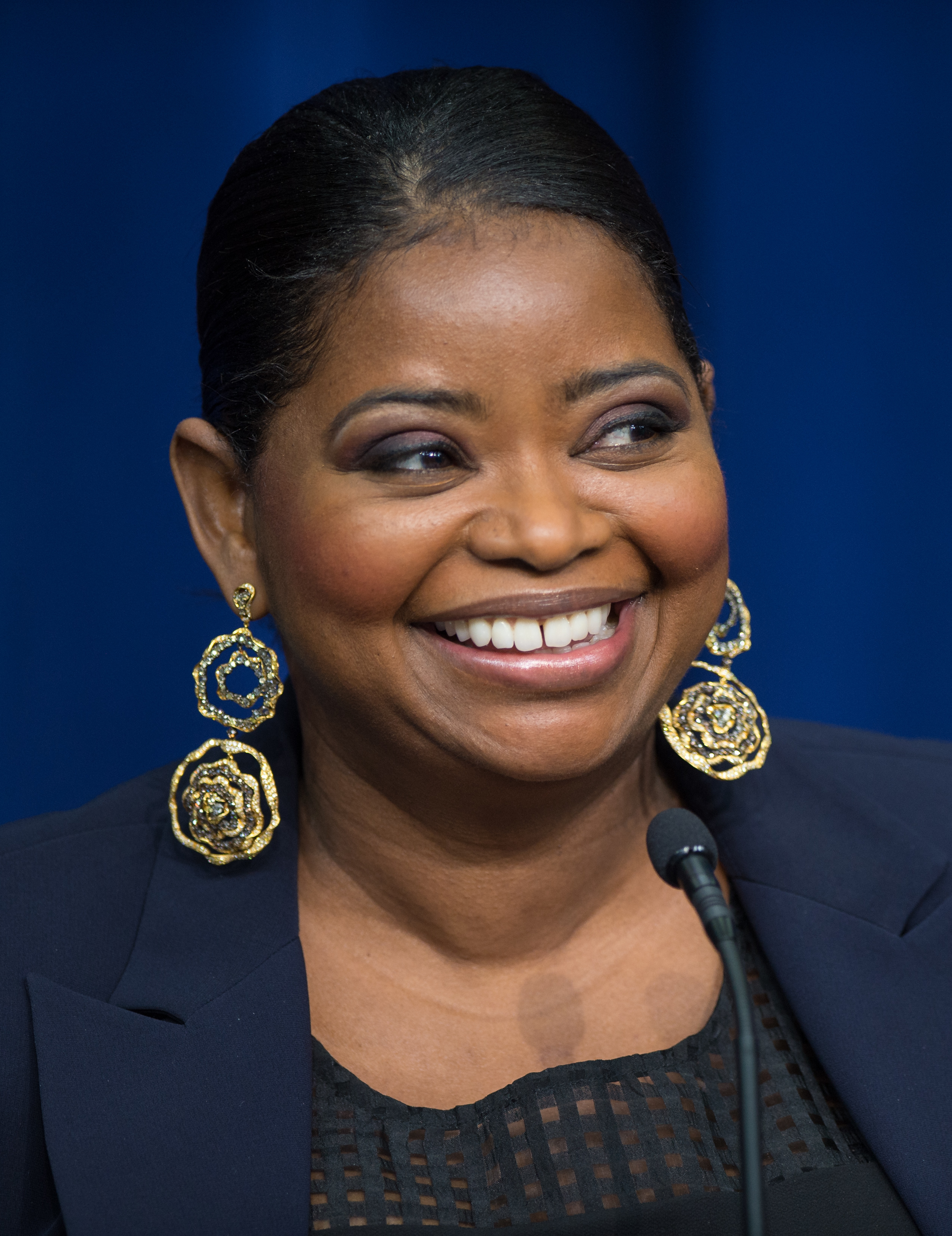
Octavia Spencer

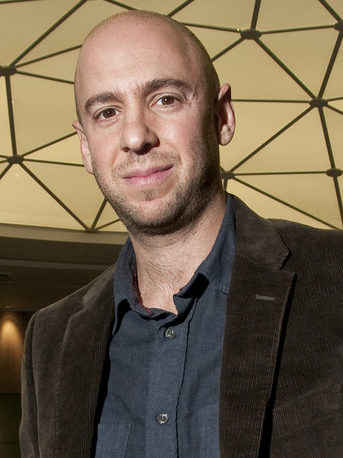
John Hamburg

- May 1 – Dave Willis, voice actor, writer, animator, producer, and musician
- May 2
  - Julie Blaha, politician
  - Matt Gerald, actor and screenwriter
- May 3
  - Bobby Cannavale, actor
  - Michael Kang, director
- May 4
  - Gregg Alexander, singer/songwriter and frontman for New Radicals
  - Will Arnett, Canadian-born actor
  - Dawn Staley, basketball coach
- May 5
  - LaPhonso Ellis, basketball player
  - Kyan Douglas, television personality
  - Todd Newton, television personality
- May 6 – Bud Brutsman, executive producer and show creator
- May 7 – Mark Brooks, producer, director, writer, and musician
- May 8
  - Troy Brenna, stunt performer
  - Reggie Freeman, football player
  - Dale Strong, politician
- May 9
  - Curtis Bray, football player and coach (d. 2014)
  - Janice Dean, Canadian-born meteorologist, television host, and author
  - Dostie, basketball player and television personality
  - Ghostface Killah, rapper
  - Curtis Bray, football player and coach (d. 2014)
- May 10 – Craig Mack, rapper (d. 2018)
- May 11
  - Britt Bonneau, basketball player and coach
  - Harold Ford Jr., financial marketing director, author, and politician
- May 12
  - Stevie Anderson, football player
  - Lisa Brescia, actress
  - Tom Briggs, football player
  - Eric Champion, Christian musician
  - Raj Chandarlapaty, educator and author
  - Samantha Mathis, actress
  - David A. R. White, actor and producer
- May 13
  - Eric Agol, astronomer and astrophysicist
  - Ian Agol, mathematician
  - Mark Beaufait, ice hockey player
  - Mindy Brashears, Under Secretary for Food Safety at the U.S. Department of Agriculture (2020-2021)
- May 14 – Daniel Lewin, American-born Israeli mathematician and entrepreneur (d. 2001)
- May 15
  - Eddie Bravo, martial artist
  - Tony Brown, football player
  - Prince Be, rapper, singer, record producer, and member of P.M. Dawn (d. 2016)
  - Brad Rowe, actor, writer, producer, and public policy advocate
  - Rod Smith, football player
- May 17
  - A.L.T., rapper
  - Jordan Knight, singer/songwriter and member of New Kids on the Block
- May 18
  - Scott Baker, baseball player
  - Tina Fey, comedian and actress
- May 19 – Cliff Boro, entrepreneur and investor
- May 20
  - Crissy Ahmann-Leighton, Olympic swimmer
  - Terrell Brandon, basketball player
  - Cookie Buffet, drag queen
- May 21 – Taylor Sheridan, actor, producer, writer, and director
- May 22
  - Marla Malcolm Beck, entrepreneur
  - Jimmy Bennington, drummer
  - Mark Bingham, businessman and passenger on board United Airlines Flight 93 (d. 2001)
  - Dewell Brewer, football player
  - Noah Feldman, legal scholar and academic
  - Brody Stevens, actor and comedian (d. 2019)
- May 23
  - Nanette Burstein, director
  - Matt Flynn, musician
  - Robert Peirce, attorney
- May 24
  - Michael Chioldi, opera singer
  - Tommy Page, singer/songwriter (d. 2017)
  - Jeff Zgonina, football player
- May 25
  - Lindsay and Sidney Greenbush, actresses
  - Jamie Kennedy, actor and comedian
  - Octavia Spencer, actress
- May 26
  - Eric Anderson, basketball player (d. 2018)
  - Sebastian Barrie, football player
  - Nick Bertozzi, comic book writer and artist
  - Keith Gattis, country singer/songwriter (d. 2023)
  - John Hamburg, writer and director
- May 27
  - Alex Archer, American-born Australian musician
  - Mara Brock Akil, screenwriter and producer
  - Robert Brown, musician and frontman for Abney Park
- May 28
  - Michael Barrett, cinematographer
  - Jason Belser, football player
  - David Booth, basketball player and executive
- May 29
  - Todd Berrier, NASCAR crew chief
  - Pete Gas, wrestler

=== June ===
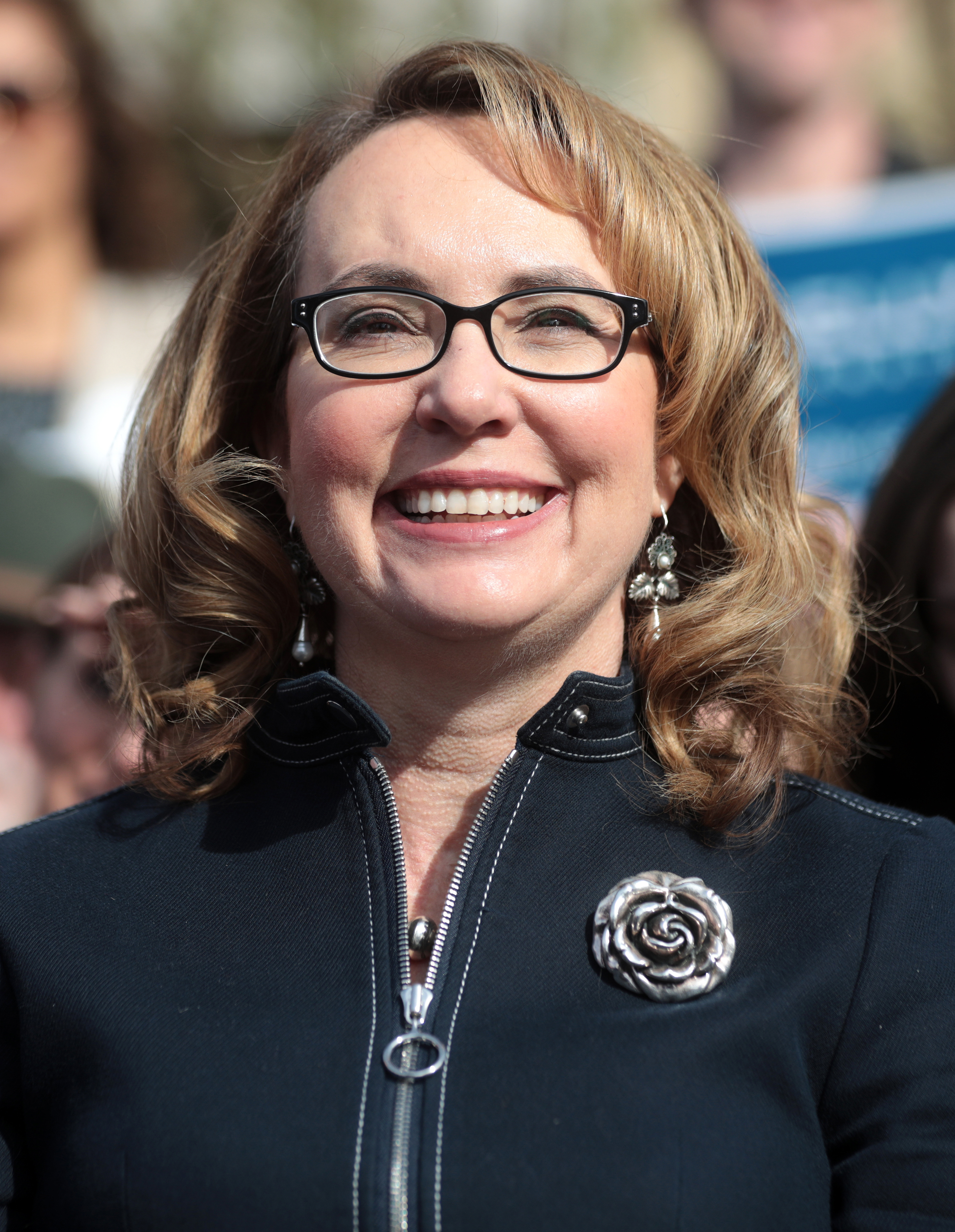
Gabby Giffords

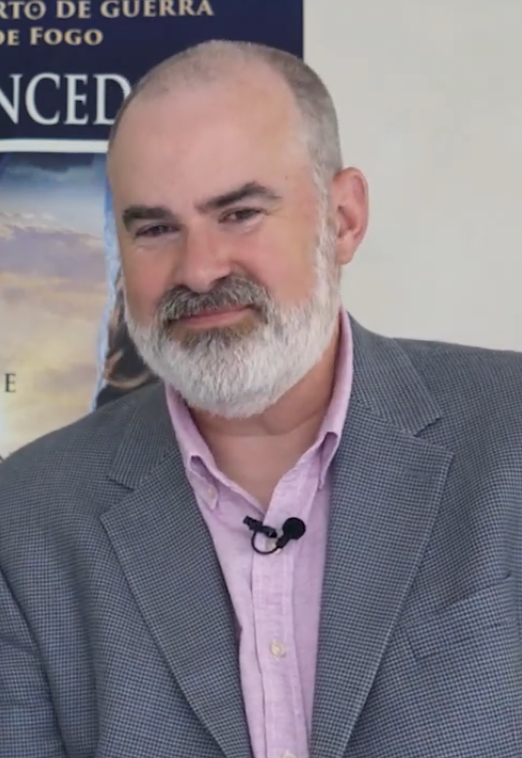
Alex Kendrick

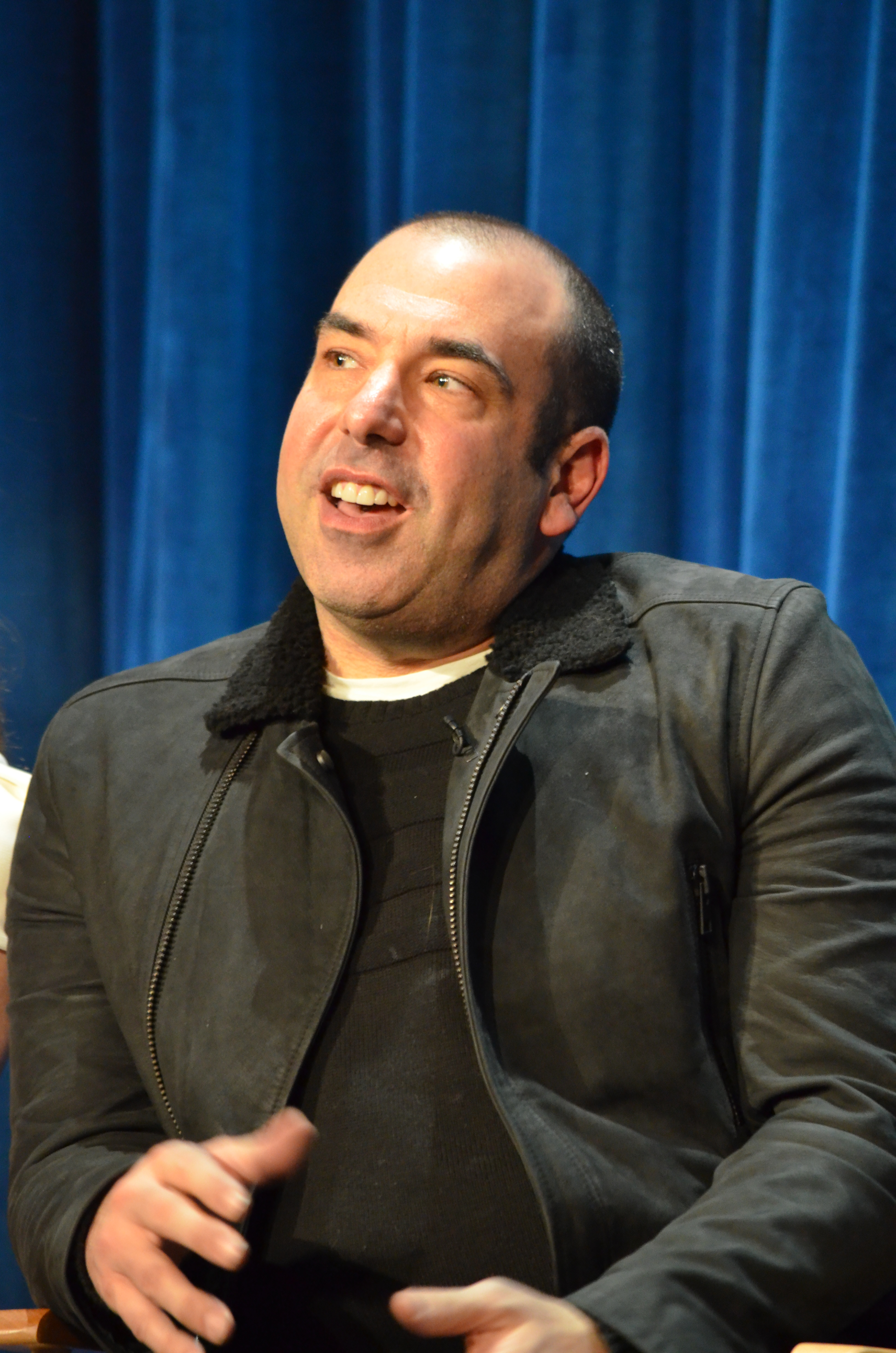
Rick Hoffman

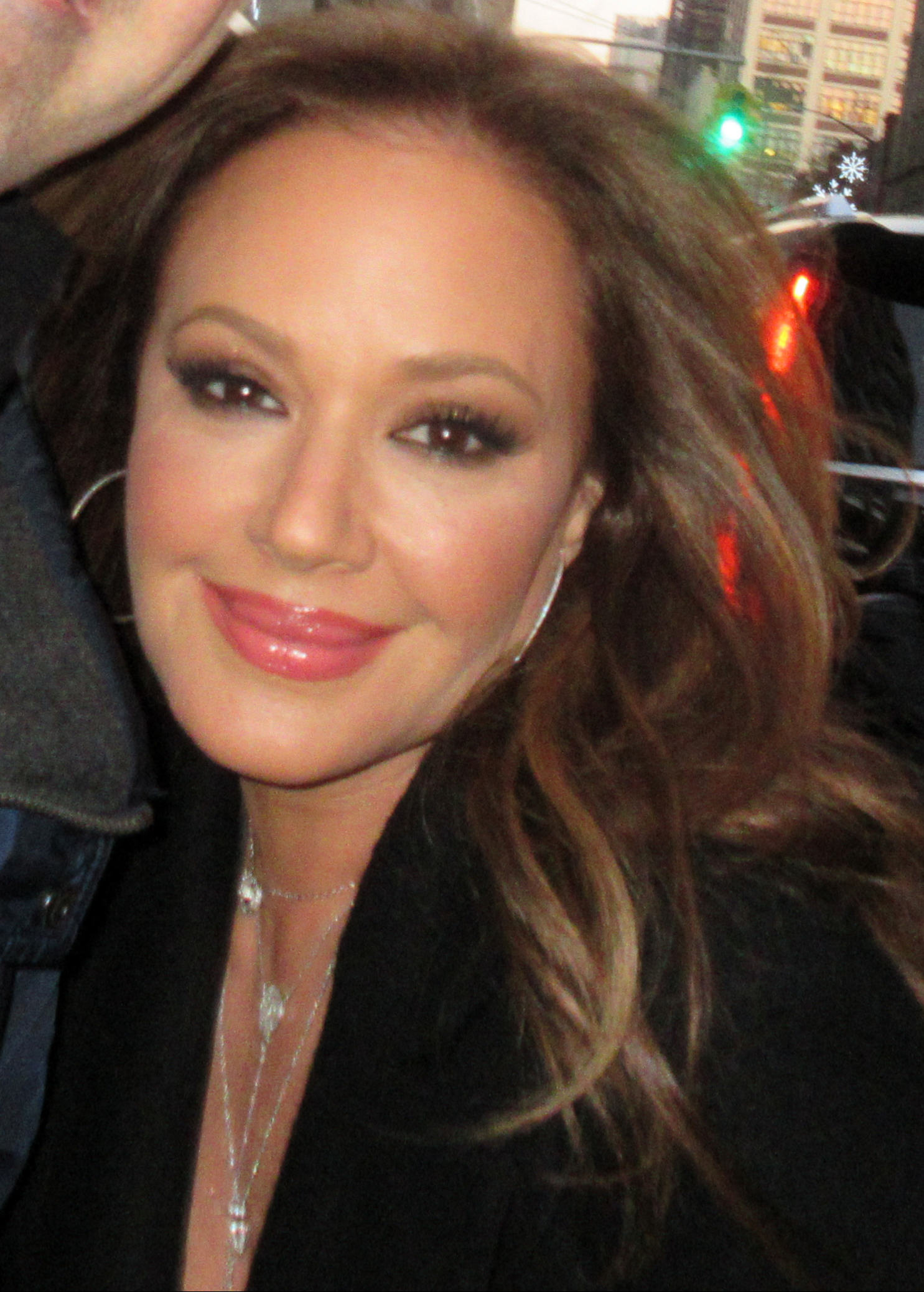
Leah Remini

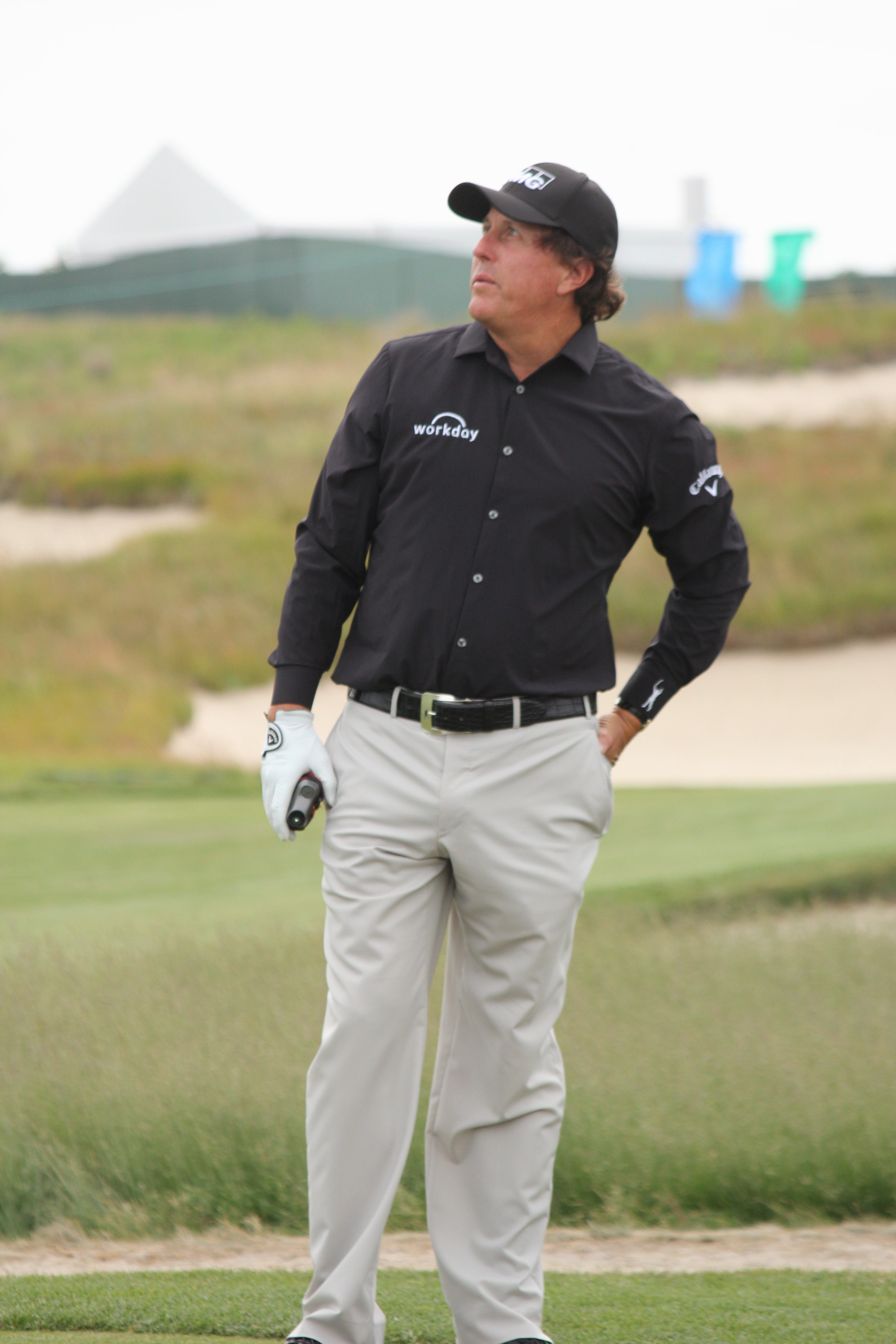
Phil Mickelson

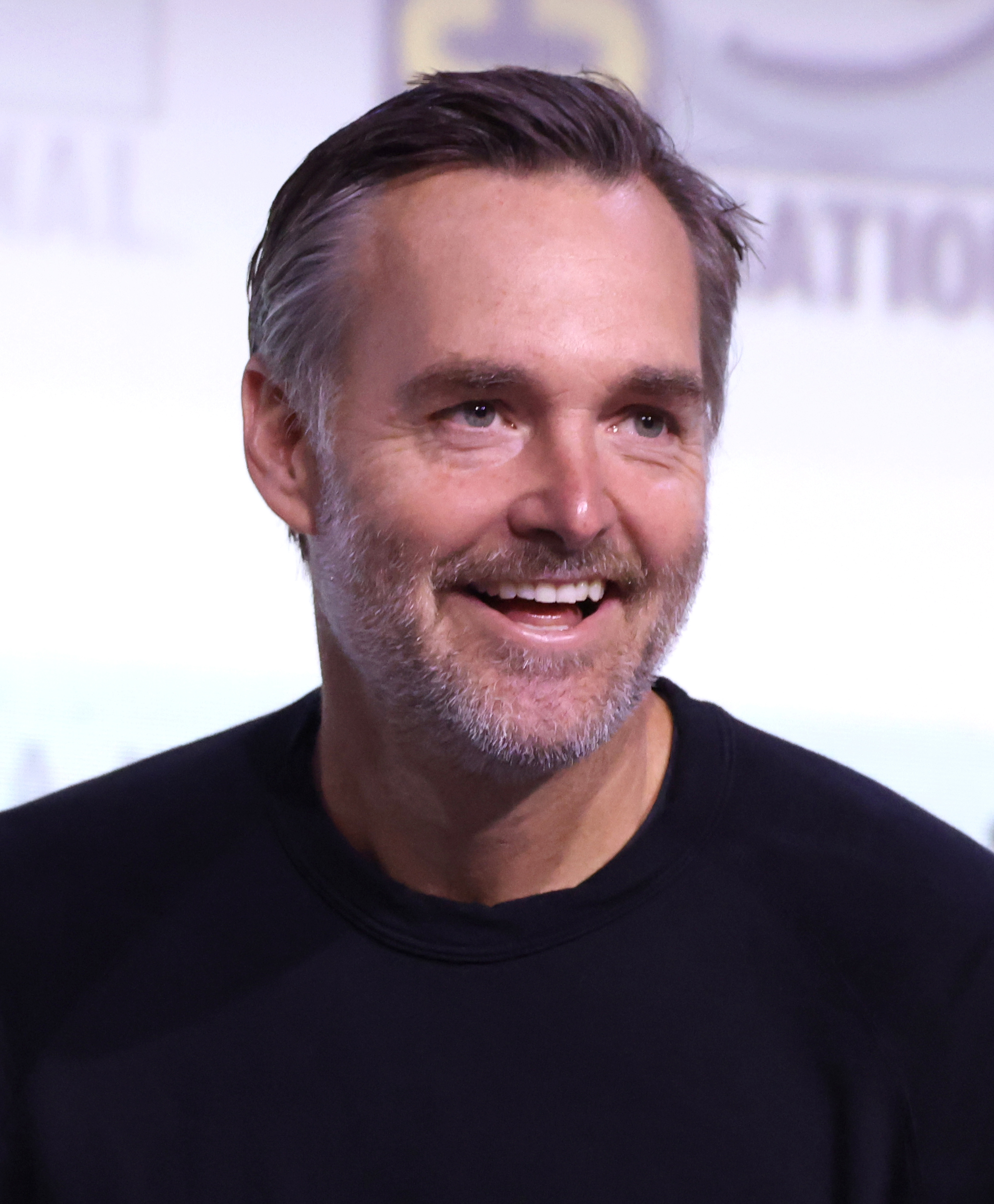
Will Forte

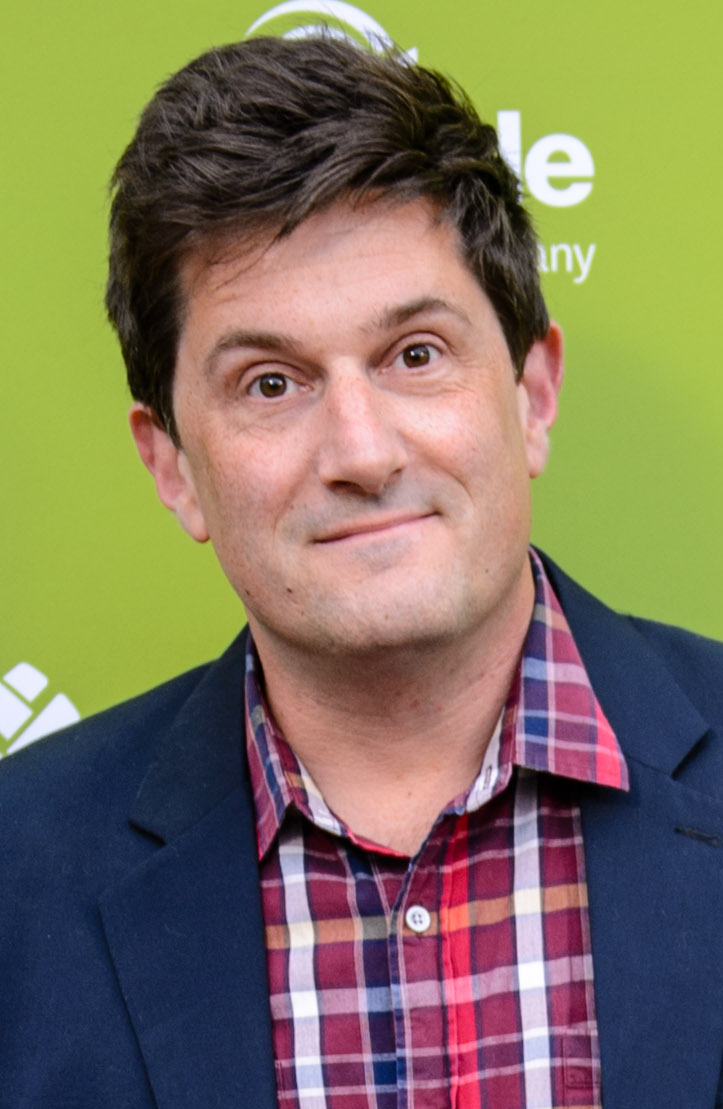
Michael Showalter

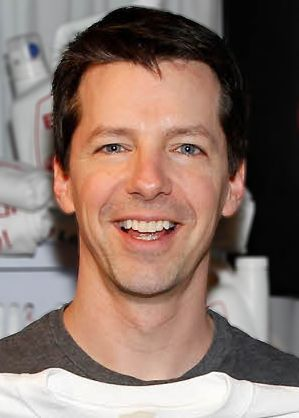
Sean Hayes

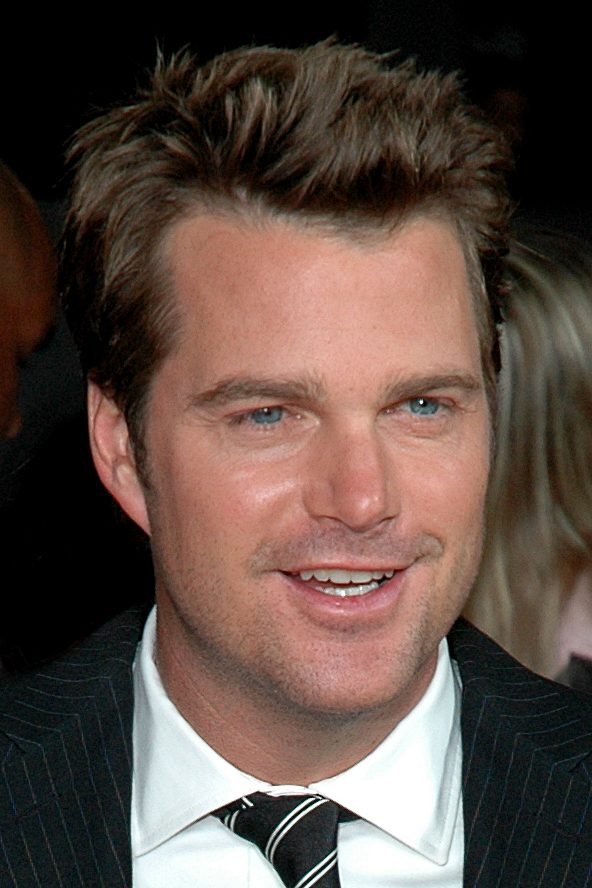
Chris O'Donnell

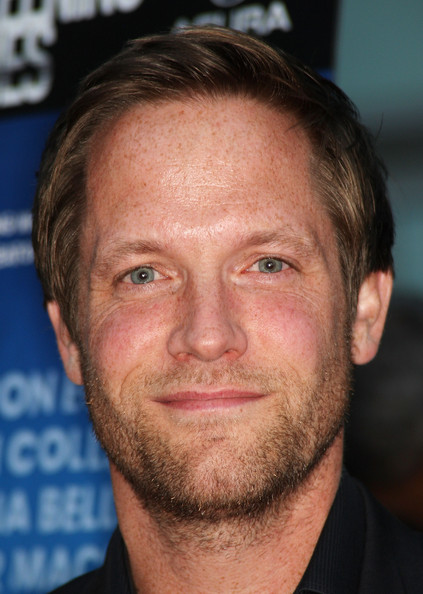
Matt Letscher

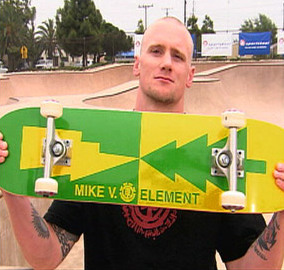
Mike Vallely

- June 1
  - Juan Miguel Betancourt, Catholic priest and bishop
  - Andrea Fay Friedman, actress (d. 2023)
  - Alexi Lalas, soccer player
  - Ian Rotten, wrestler and promoter
  - Paul Schrier, actor, director, and artist
- June 2 – B-Real, rapper
- June 3
  - Susan Abulhawa, Kuwaiti-born writer and human rights activist
  - Carolyn Bourdeaux, politician
  - Lanee Butler, Olympic windsurfer
  - Heather Cox, sports broadcaster
  - Greg Hancock, motorcycle racer
  - Ammon McNeely, rock climber (d. 2023)
- June 5 – Deborah Yates, dancer and actress
- June 6
  - J. C. Adams, author, magazine editor, and reporter
  - DeChon Burns, football coach
  - Randy Jordan, football player and coach
  - Munky, musician
- June 7 – Mike Modano, hockey player
- June 8
  - Brian Baker, track and field runner
  - Troy Benson, Olympic skier
  - Gabby Giffords, politician
  - Kwame Kilpatrick, politician
  - Kelli Williams, actress
- June 10
  - Niel Brandt, astronomer and University professor
  - Dwayne Burno, jazz bassist (d. 2013)
- June 11
  - Lonni Alameda, softball player and coach
  - Alex Barron, racing driver
  - Alex Kendrick, pastor, filmmaker, and actor
- June 12
  - Freddie Bradley, football player
  - Damon Buford, baseball player
  - Rick Hoffman, actor
- June 13 – Rivers Cuomo, singer and frontman for Weezer
- June 14
  - Mick Bates, Australian-born politician
  - Willie Beamon, football player
  - Jeffrey Brock, mathematician
  - Ray Luzier, musician
- June 15
  - Christian Bauman, novelist, essayist, and lyricist
  - Randy Buckner, neuroscientist and psychologist
  - Kevin Mullin, politician
  - Leah Remini, actress, television presenter, and campaigner
- June 16
  - Roslyn Clark Artis, lawyer, academic administrator, and 14th president of Benedict College
  - Clifton Collins Jr., actor
  - Phil Mickelson, golfer
- June 17
  - Arnold Ale, football player
  - Alma Allen, sculptor
  - Whit Babcock, University athletics director
  - John Bray, boxer
  - Will Forte, actor and comedian
  - Michael Showalter, actor, writer, and director
- June 19
  - Kimberly Baldwin, cyclist
  - Head, musician
  - D-Nice, rapper and member of Boogie Down Productions
  - Quincy Watts, Olympic sprinter
- June 20
  - Marc Andreyko, comic book writer and screenwriter
  - Helge Boes, German-born CIA officer (d. 2003)
  - Carrie Borzillo, journalist and author
  - Jason Robert Brown, composer, lyricist, and playwright
- June 21 – Pete Rock, rapper and DJ
- June 22
  - Colette Burson, screenwriter, producer, and director
  - Freddy Soto, comedian and actor (d. 2005)
  - Michael Trucco, actor
- June 23
  - Mike Bartrum, football player and coach
  - Robert Brooks, football player
  - Josh Byrnes, baseball player and executive
  - Zen Gesner, actor
- June 24 – Glenn Medeiros, singer/songwriter
- June 25
  - Duncan Brannan, voice actor
  - Bryan E. Burns, archaeologist and University professor
- June 26
  - Paul Thomas Anderson, screenwriter and director
  - Bill Behrens, tennis player
  - Irv Gotti, record producer (d. 2025)
  - Sean Hayes, actor, comedian and producer
  - Chris O'Donnell, actor
  - Matt Letscher, actor and playwright
  - Nick Offerman, actor, writer, and carpenter
  - David Teeuwen, managing editor of USA Today (d. 2015)
- June 27
  - Ahmed Ahmed, Egyptian-born actor and comedian
  - Alex Blackwell, basketball player
- June 28
  - Ace Atkins, journalist and author
  - Steve Burton, actor
  - Mike White, writer, director, actor, and producer
- June 29 – Mike Vallely, skateboarder, actor, and musician
- June 30
  - Chris Conrad, actor
  - Brian Bloom, actor, voice actor, and screenwriter

=== July ===
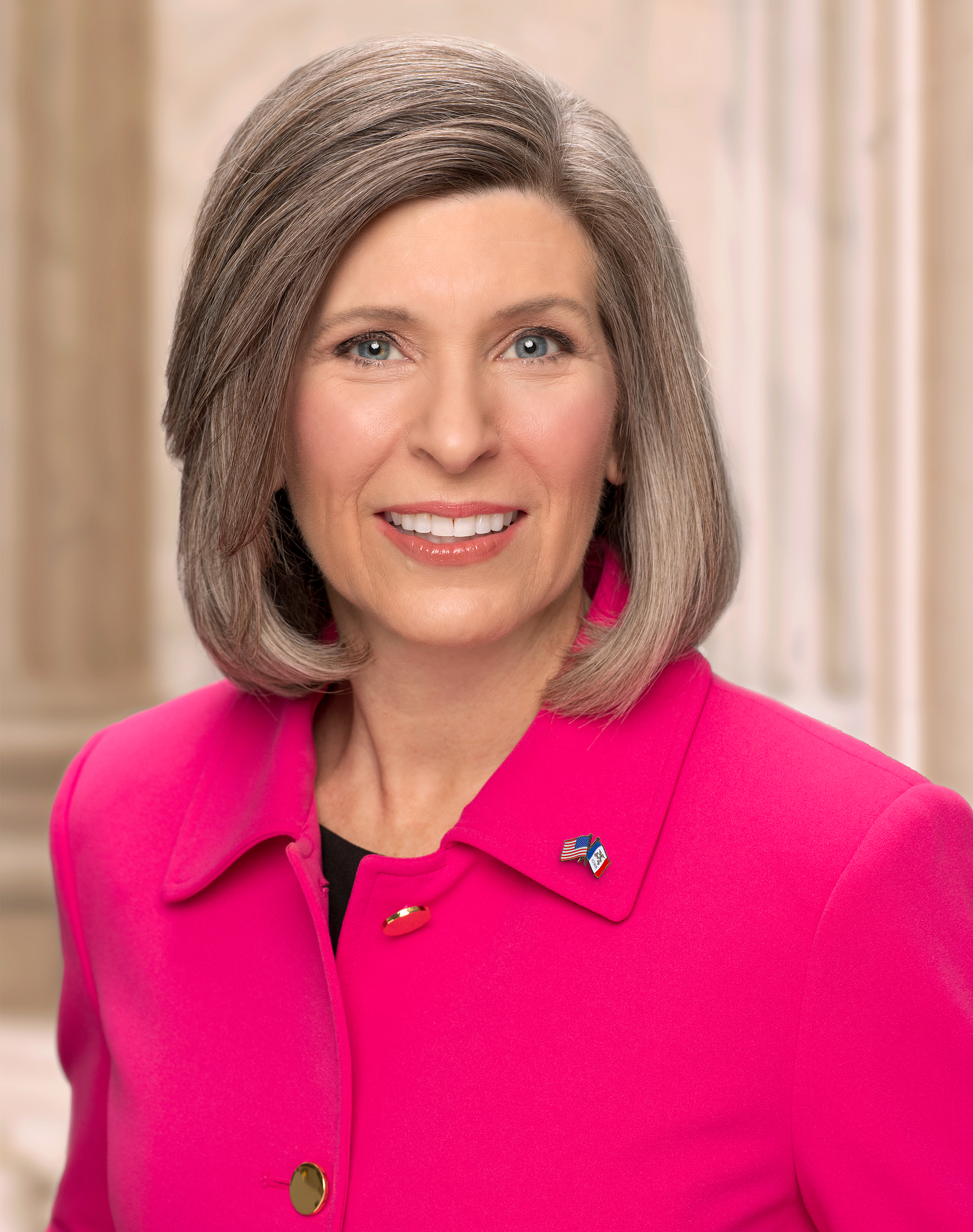
Joni Ernst

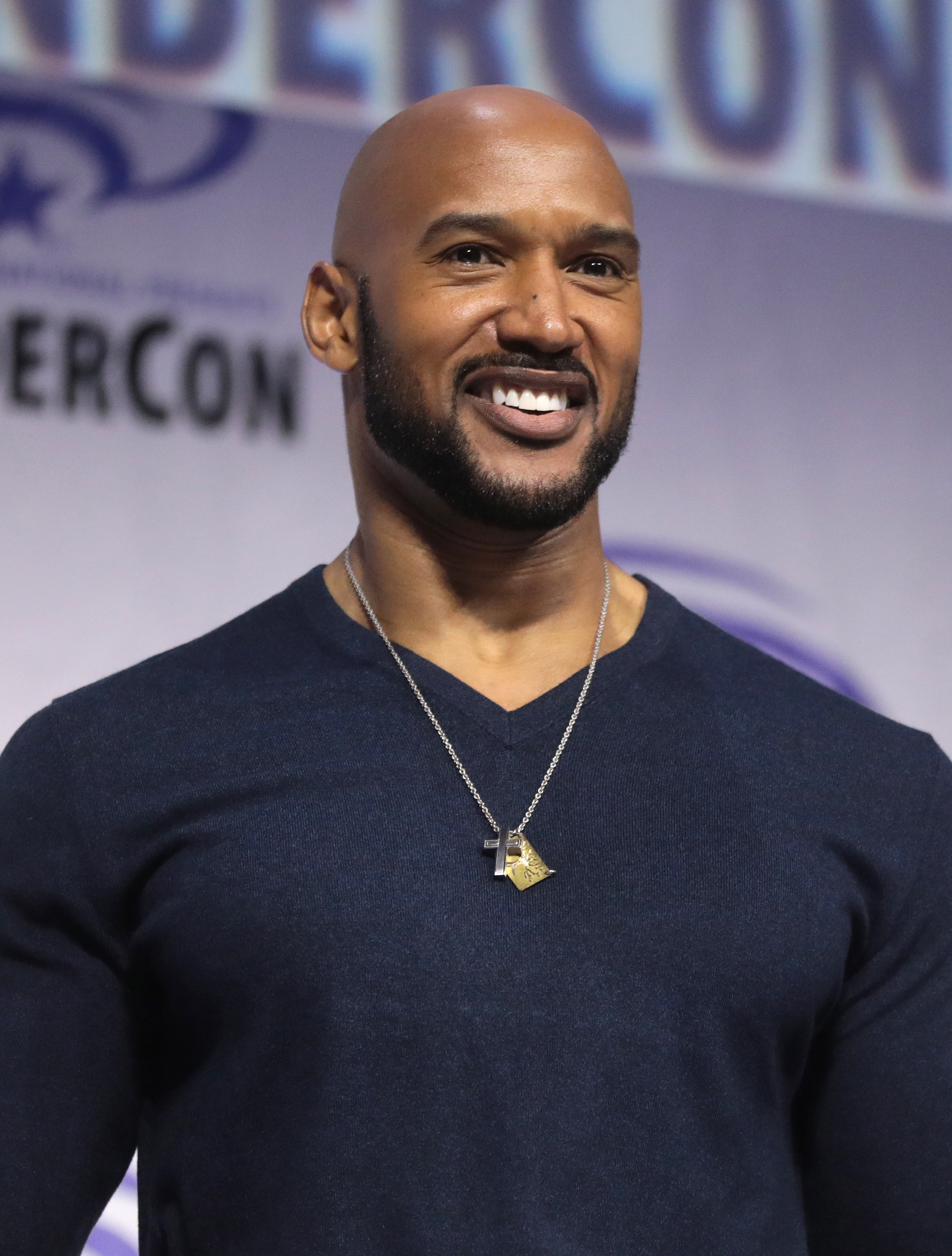
Henry Simmons

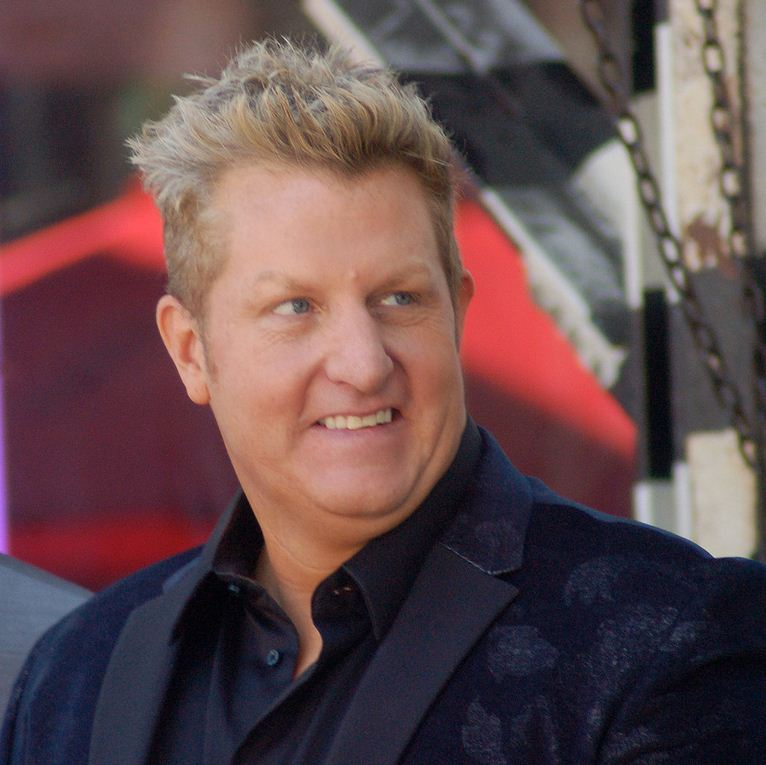
Gary LeVox

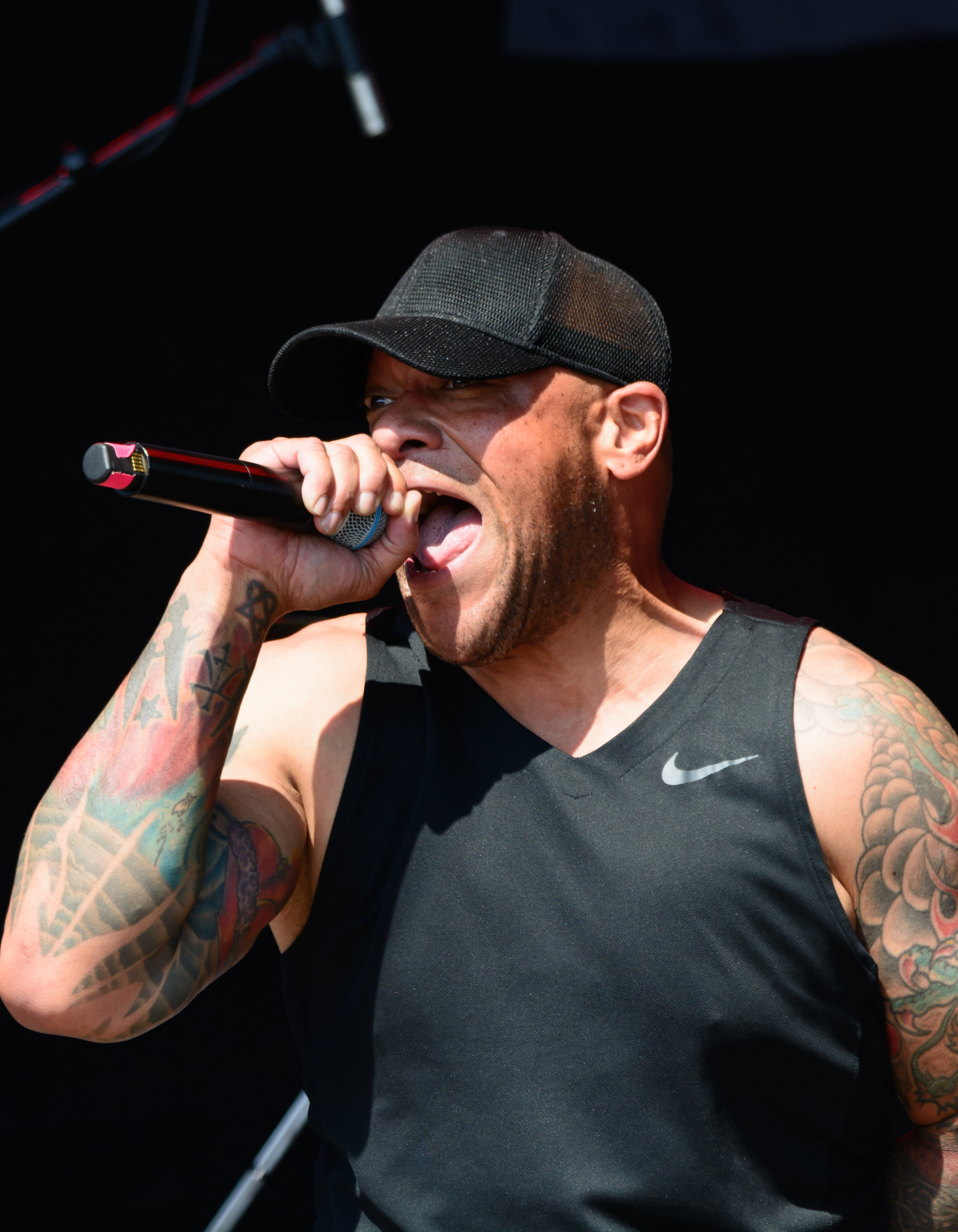
Howard Jones

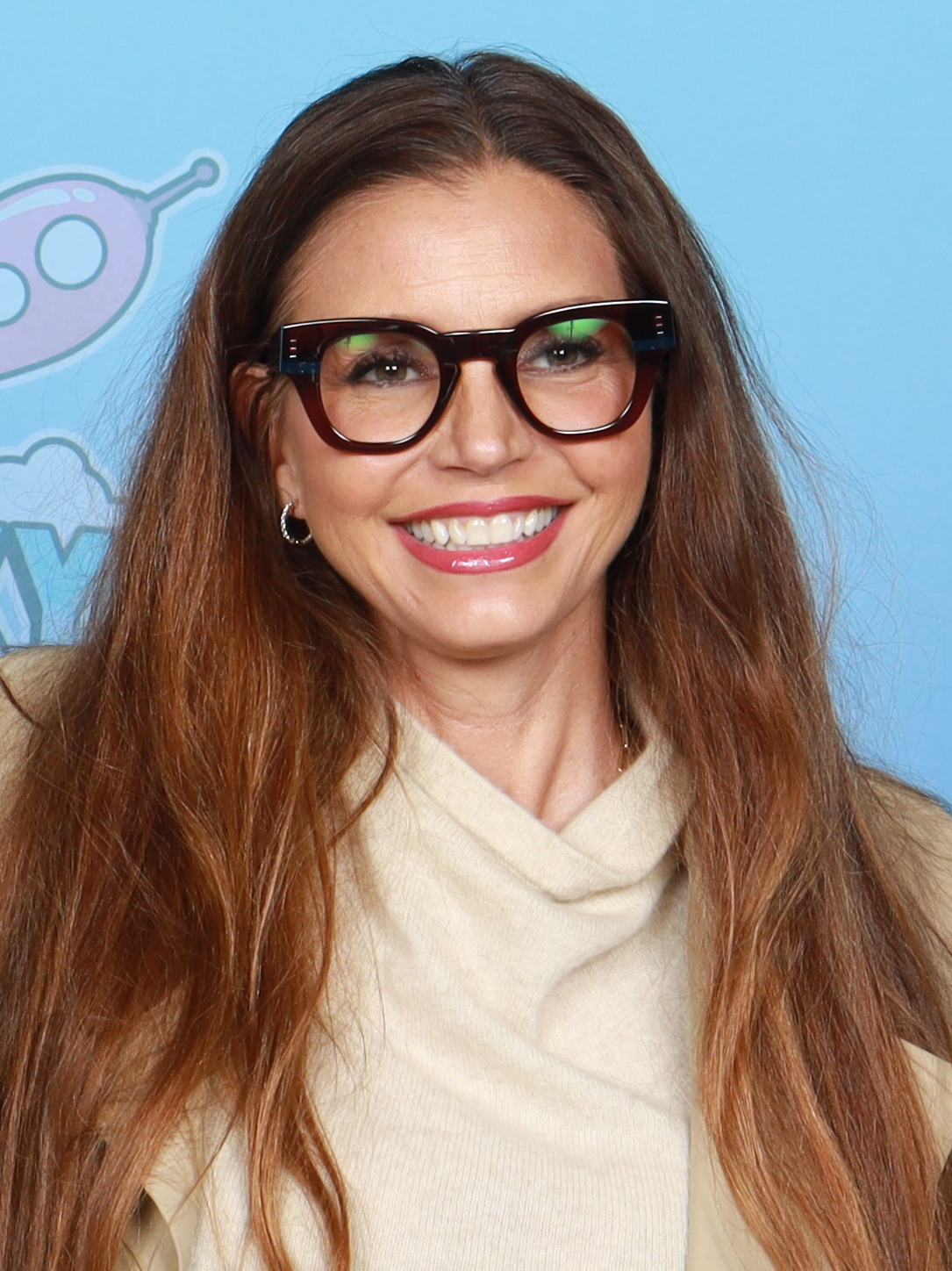
Charisma Carpenter

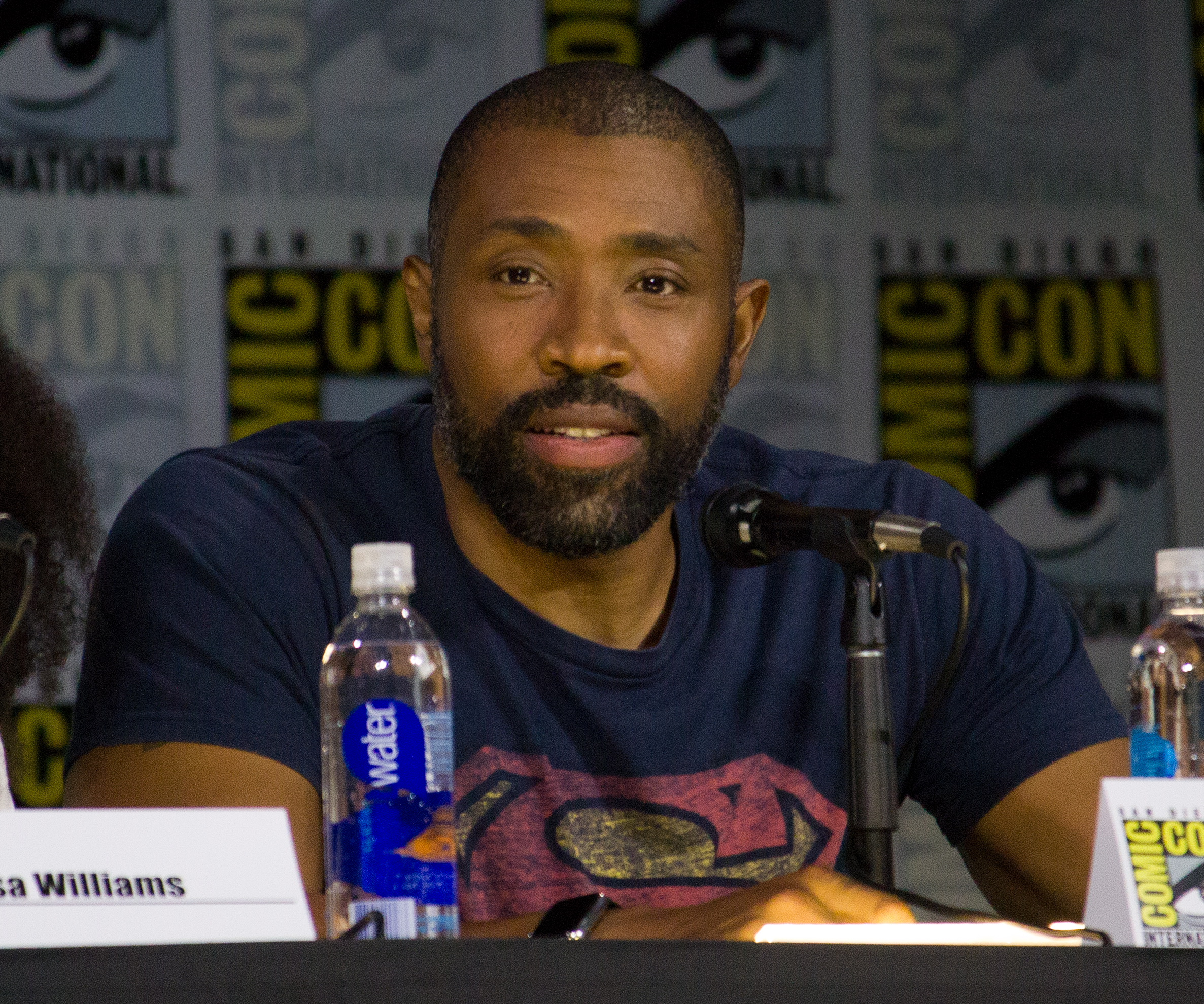
Cress Williams

- July 1
  - Joni Ernst, politician
  - Henry Simmons, actor
- July 2
  - Derrick Adkins, Olympic hurdler
  - Scott Aukerman, writer, actor, comedian, television personality, director, producer, and podcast host
  - Yancy Butler, actress
  - Spice 1, rapper
  - Amy Weber, actress, model, producer, singer, real estate broker, and wrestling valet
- July 3
  - Victor Bailey, football player
  - Anindya Bhattacharyya, Indian-born technology instructor
  - Audra McDonald, actress and singer
- July 4 – Garrett Bradley, politician
- July 5
  - Joe Berry, football coach
  - Doug Bochtler, baseball player
  - Kenny Dope, record producer and DJ
  - Mac Dre, rapper (d. 2004)
- July 7 – Robia LaMorte, actress and dancer
- July 8
  - Beck, singer/songwriter and record producer
  - Todd Martin, tennis player
- July 9
  - Yadesa Bojia, Ethiopian-born graphic designer and artist
  - Kevin Brown, poet, author, and teacher
  - Trent Green, football player
- July 10
  - Dexter Allen, blues singer and musician
  - Gary LeVox, singer/songwriter and frontman for Rascal Flatts
- July 11
  - Billy Ashley, baseball player
  - Gil Blair, politician
  - Chad Brown, football player
  - Justin Chambers, actor and fashion model
  - Kristen McDonald Rivet, politician
  - Michael Saucedo, Hispanic Irish actor
- July 14
  - Doug Bland, entrepreneur
  - Mark Brandenburg, baseball player
  - Mike McFarland, actor and director (d. 2026)
- July 15
  - Jenifer Alcorn, boxer
  - Chi Cheng, bassist for Deftones (d. 2013)
- July 16
  - Keith Barr, businessman
  - Derek Bouchard-Hall, Olympic cyclist
- July 18
  - Sal Abruscato, metal singer and drummer for Type O Negative and Life of Agony
  - Cheryl Casone, news anchor
- July 19 – Lenny Curry, politician, Mayor of Jacksonville, Florida (2015–present)
- July 20
  - Anjanette Abayari, actress and beauty queen
  - Shannon Baker, football player
  - Howard Jones, singer and frontman for Blood Has Been Shed (1997–2005), Killswitch Engage (2002–2012), and Light the Torch (2012-present)
- July 21 – Mark Butler, politician
- July 22
  - Melvin Aldridge, football player
  - Tim Bluhm, singer/songwriter, guitarist, and frontman for The Mother Hips
  - Jason R. Brown, politician
  - Scott Wiper, filmmaker
- July 23
  - Charisma Carpenter, actress
  - Rya Kihlstedt, actress
- July 24
  - Stephanie Adams, model, author, and murderer (d. 2018)
  - Braden Barty, director and producer
  - Blaine Bishop, football player
- July 26
  - Joseph Bishara, actor and composer
  - Cress Williams, actor
- July 27 – Jason Bentley, radio DJ
- July 28 – Bob Behnken, engineer and astronaut for NASA
- July 29 – Kit Hoover, television host, sportscaster, and broadcast journalist
- July 30 – Rob Ambrose, football player and coach

=== August ===
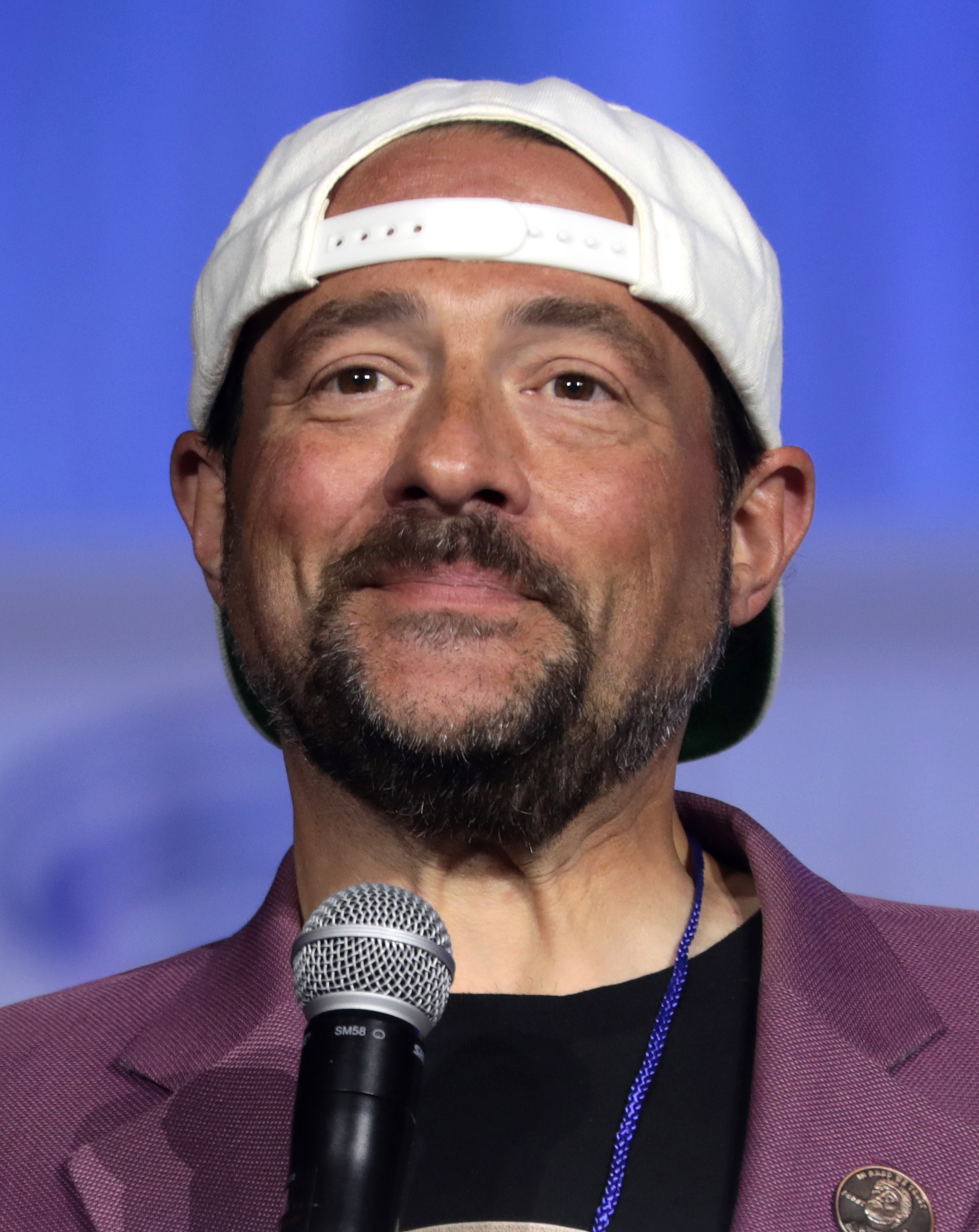
Kevin Smith

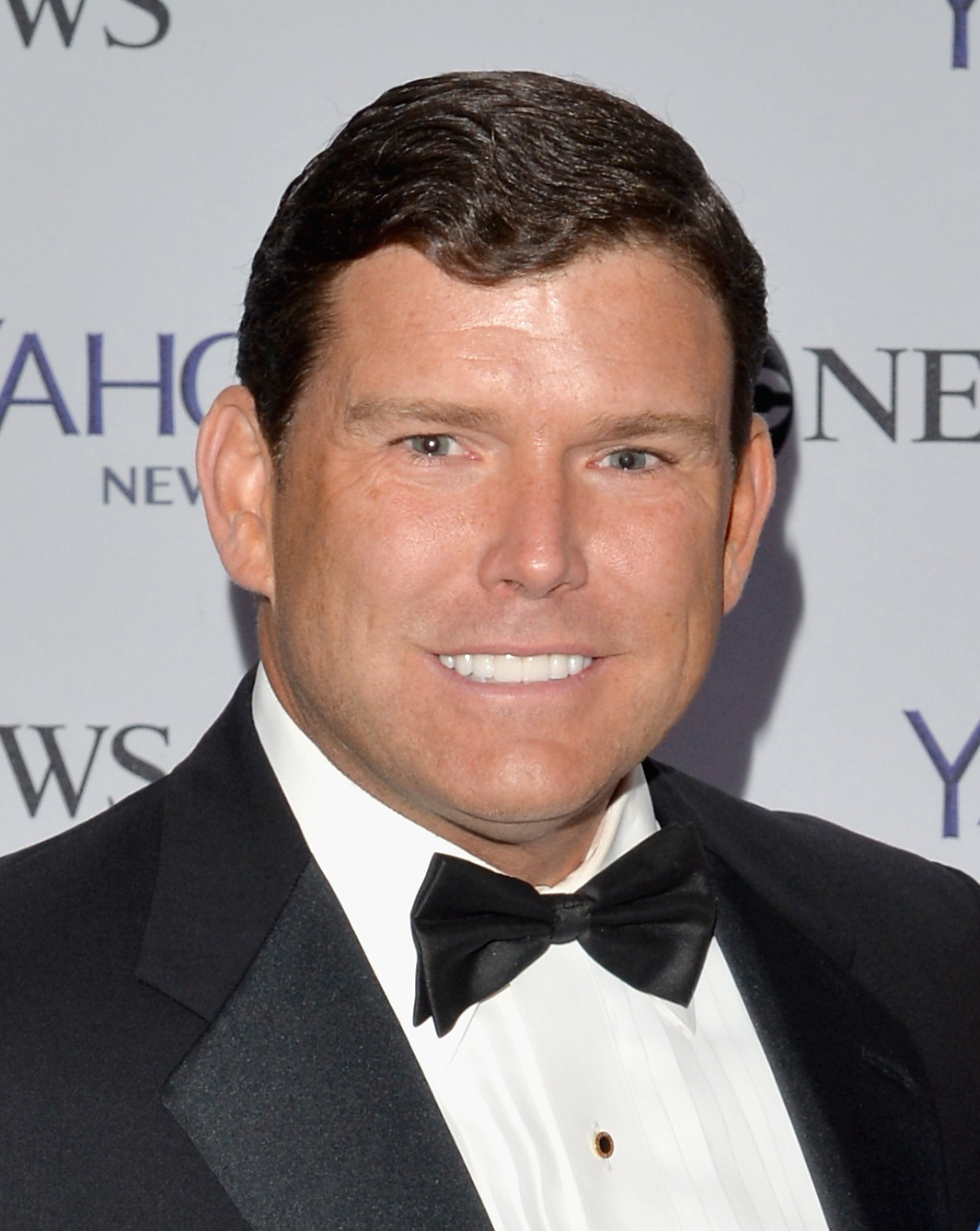
Bret Baier

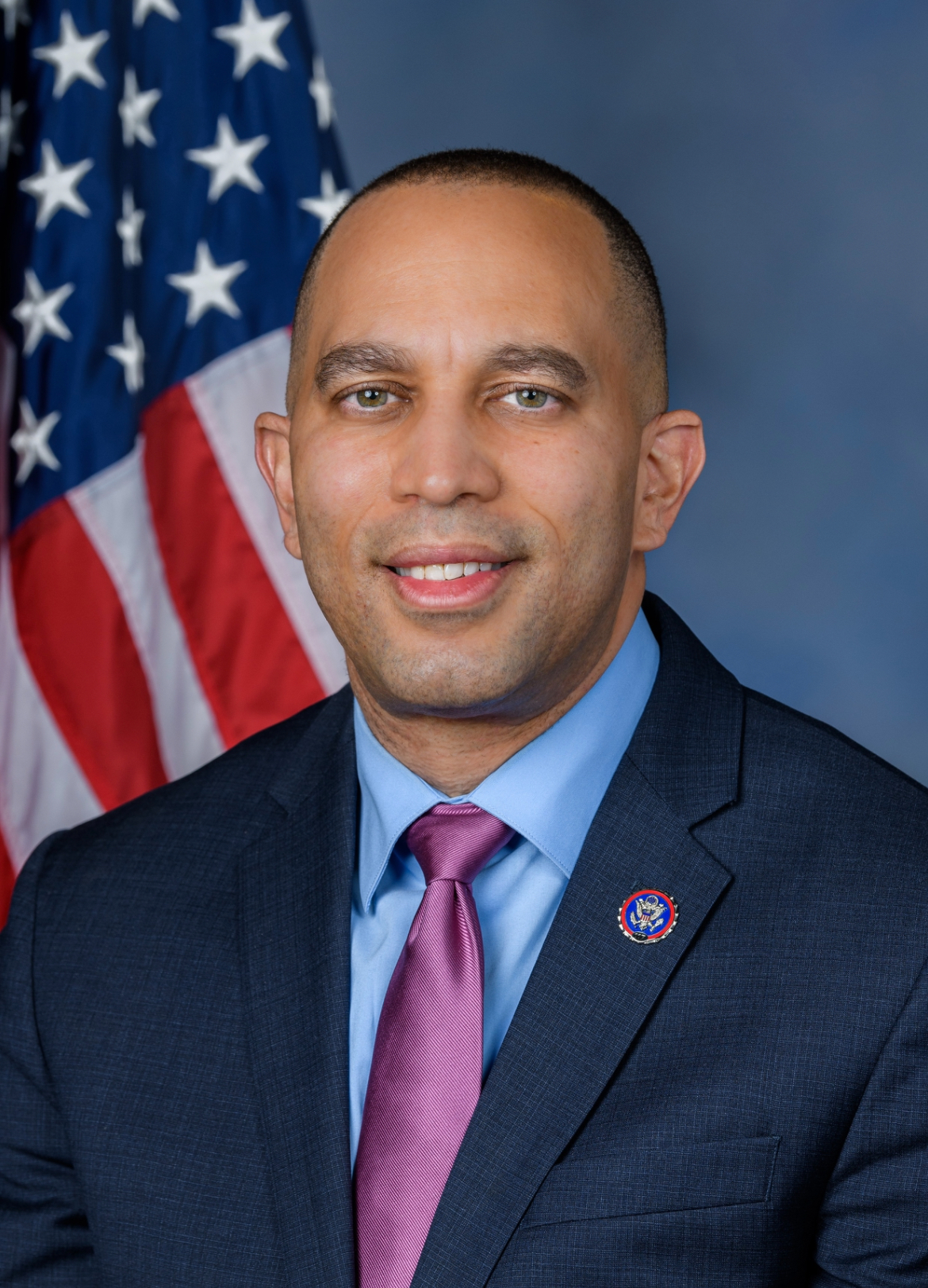
Hakeem Jeffries

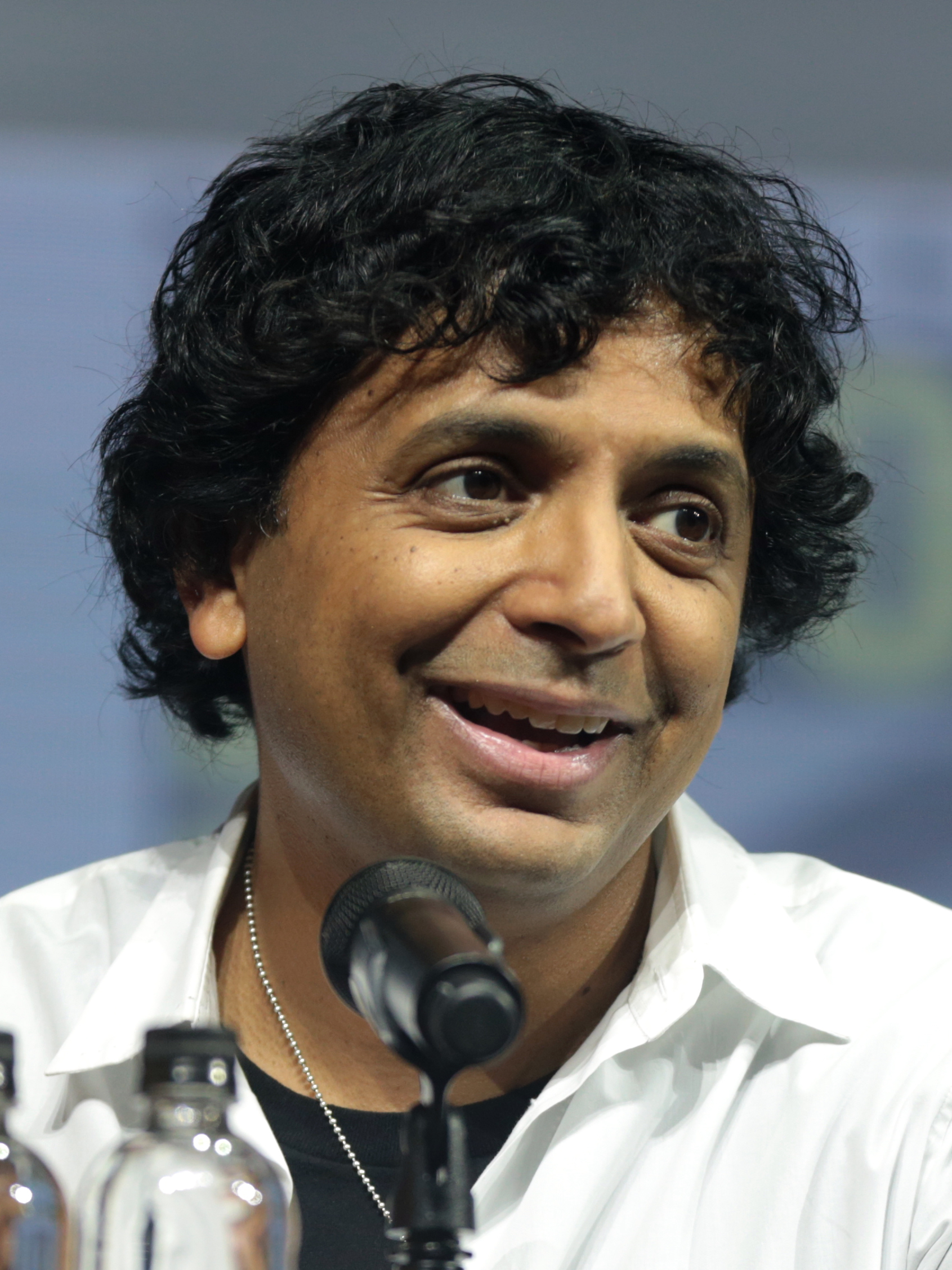
M. Night Shyamalan

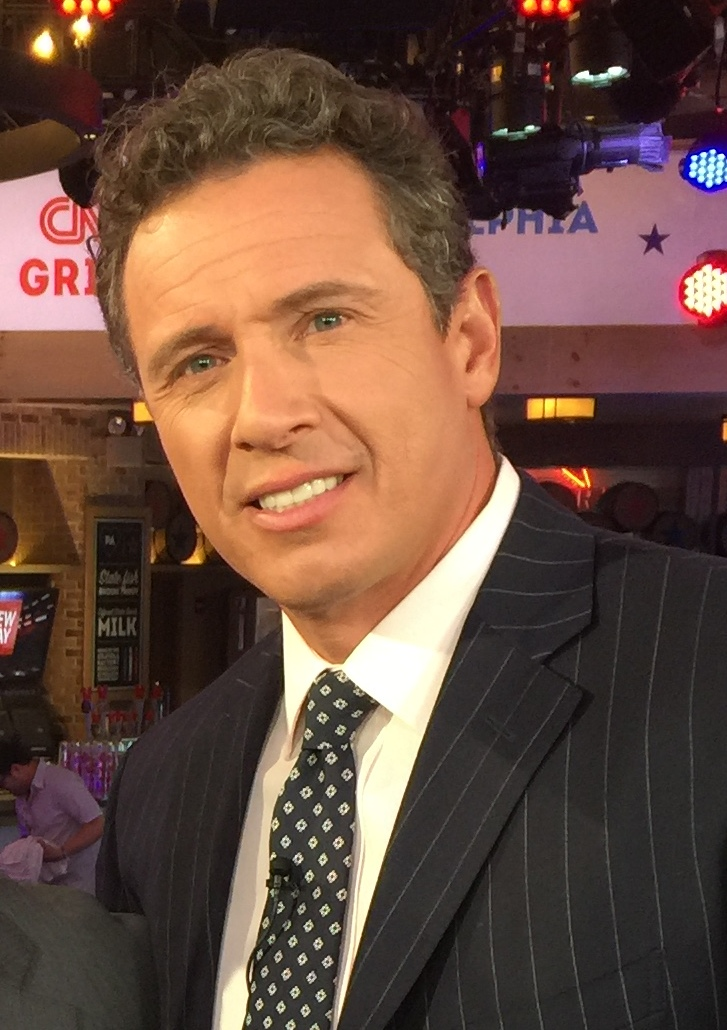
Chris Cuomo

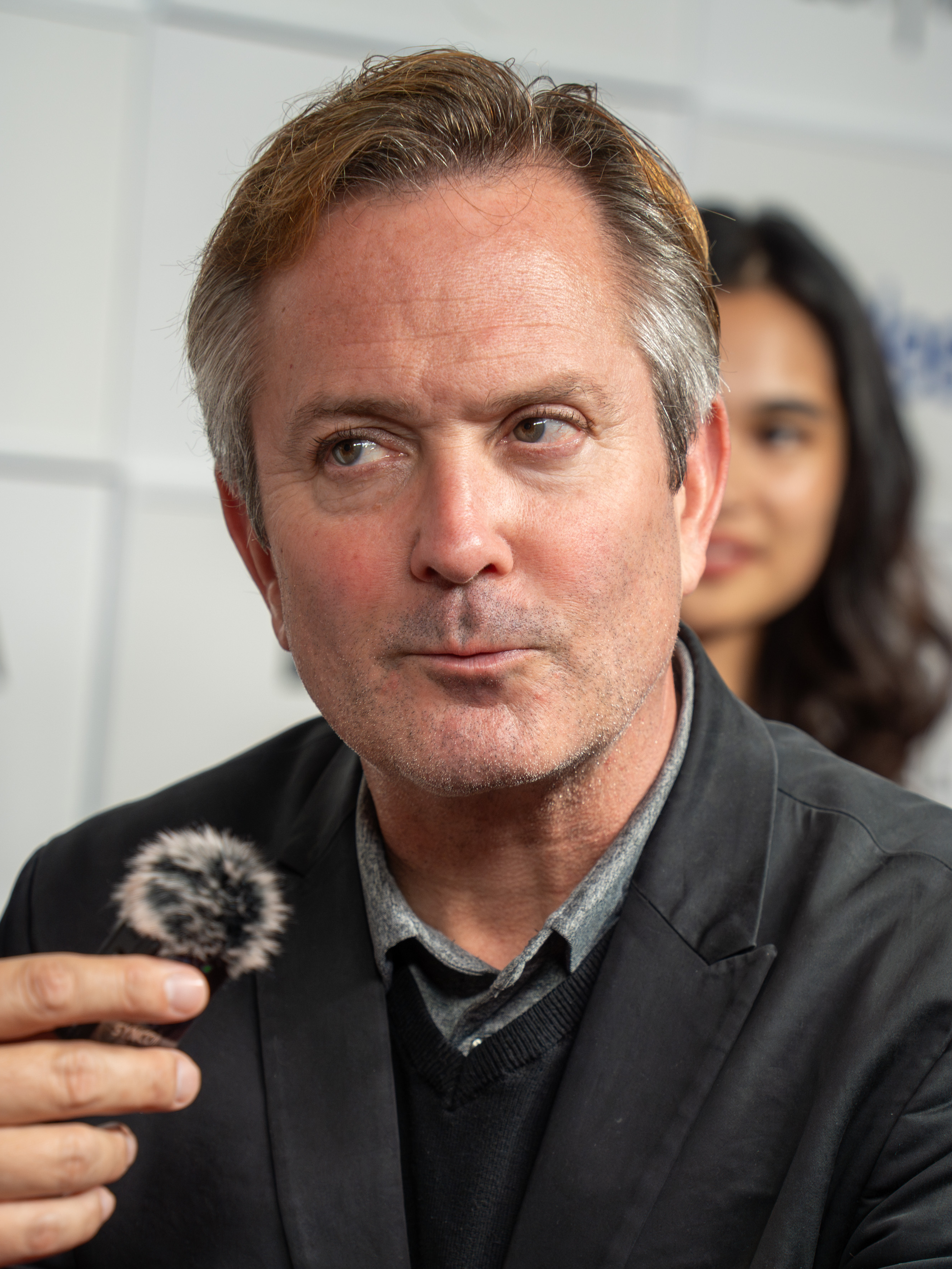
Thomas Lennon

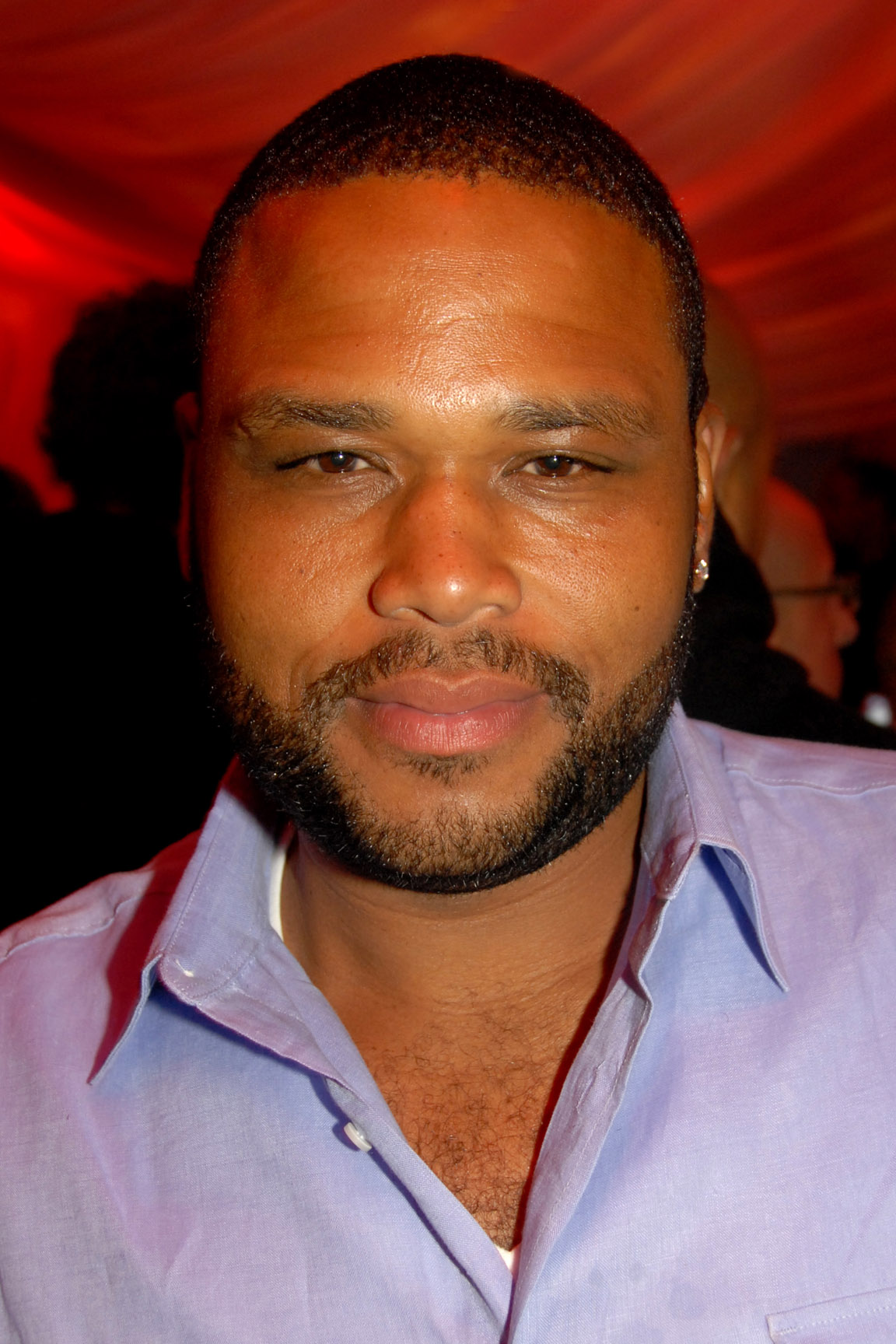
Anthony Anderson

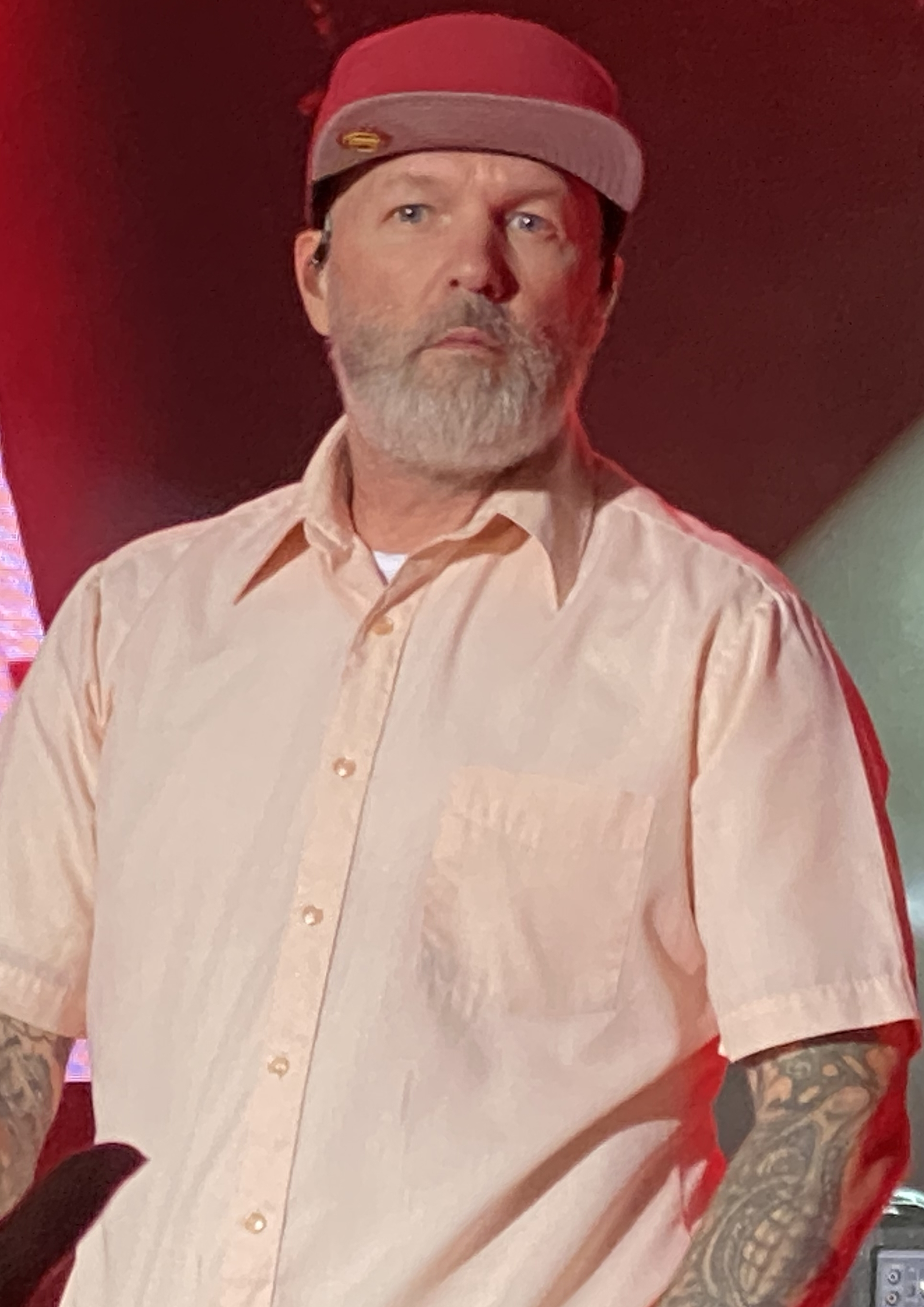
Fred Durst

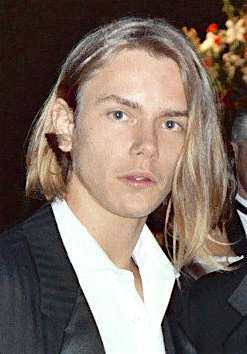
River Phoenix

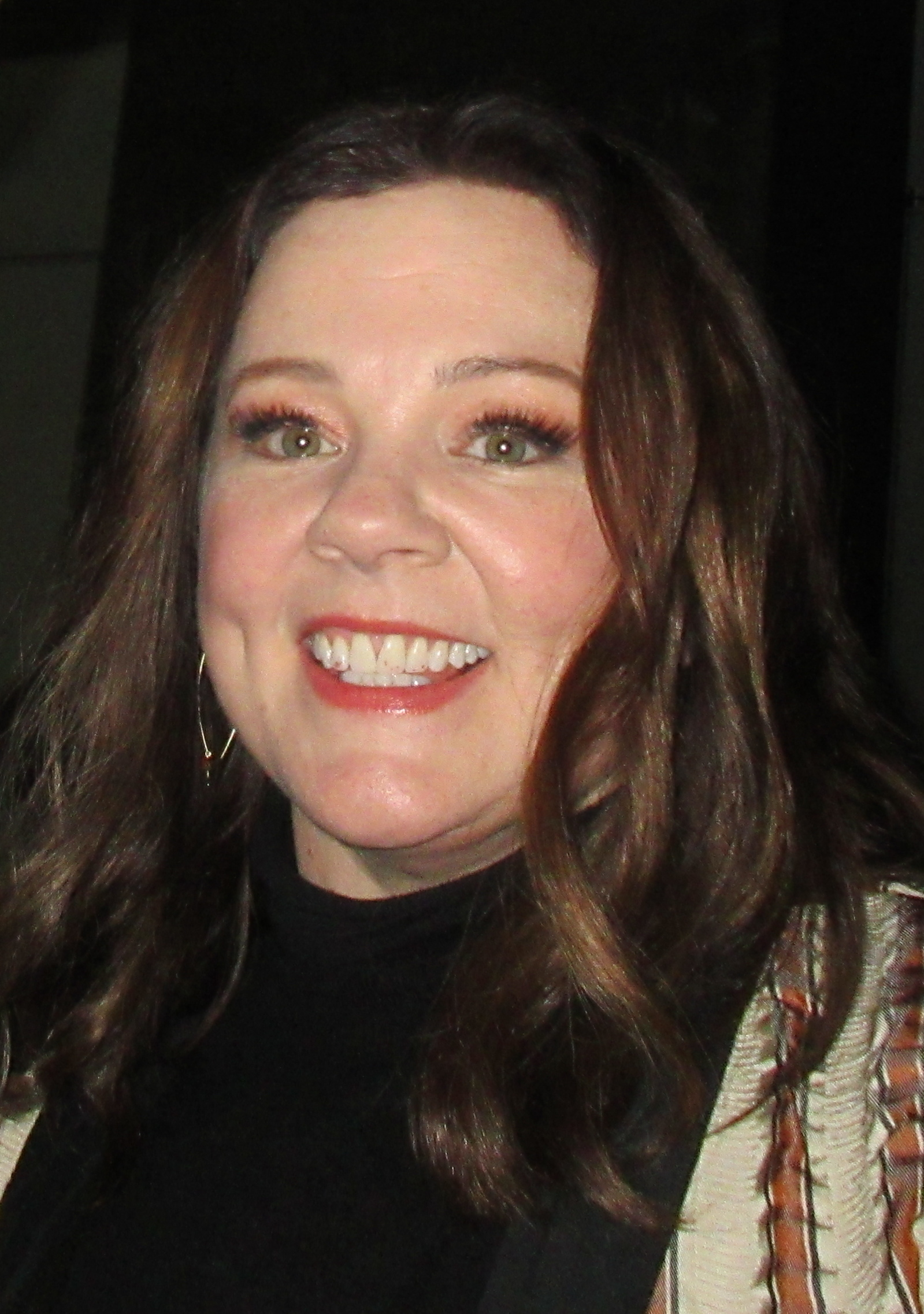
Melissa McCarthy

- August 1 – Quentin Coryatt, football player
- August 2
  - Elijah Alexander, football player (d. 2010)
  - Tony Amonte, ice hockey player
  - Kevin Smith, screenwriter, director, and actor
- August 3
  - Alejandro Alcondez, Mexican-born actor and filmmaker
  - Stephen Carpenter, guitarist for Deftones
- August 4
  - Pete Abrams, webcomic artist
  - John August, screenwriter, director, producer, and novelist
  - Bret Baier, journalist and news anchor
  - Julie Baroh, fantasy artist
  - Mike Britton, soccer player
  - Sunny Buick, Canadian-born American French painter
  - Claudine Gay, political scientist, university professor, and 30th President of Harvard University
  - Hakeem Jeffries, politician
  - Ron Lester, actor (d. 2016)
- August 6
  - M. Night Shyamalan, Indian-born filmmaker
- August 7 – Kim Hill, singer
- August 8 – Trev Alberts, sports administrator and football player
- August 9
  - Kim Barnes Arico, basketball player and coach
  - Robert Bruce, rapper and wrestler
  - Tracy Byrnes, news anchor, journalist, and accountant
  - Chris Cuomo, journalist
  - Thomas Lennon, actor, comedian, and writer
- August 10
  - Charlie Bean, filmmaker, animator, storyboard artist, and voice actor
  - Steve Bryan, tennis player
  - Doug Flach, tennis player
  - Bret Hedican, ice hockey player
- August 11
  - Charles M. Blow, journalist and commentator
  - Cary Brabham, football player
  - Paul Durousseau, convicted serial killer
- August 12 – Dan Burt, basketball coach
- August 13
  - Christopher Bell, politician
  - Will Clarke, novelist
- August 14
  - Mike Borzello, baseball coach
  - Kevin Cadogan, musician, singer/songwriter, record producer, and guitarist
- August 15
  - Anthony Anderson, actor, comedian and writer
  - Chris Byrd, boxer
  - Maddie Corman, actress
- August 16
  - Bonnie Bernstein, sportscaster
  - Alex Boyé, British-born singer, dancer, and actor
- August 17
  - Januarius Jingwa Asongu, Cameroonian-born philosopher, scholar, journalist, author, entrepreneur, and activist
  - Jim Courier, tennis player
  - Tammy Townsend, actress and singer
- August 18
  - Jay Obernolte, politician
  - Malcolm-Jamal Warner, actor (d. 2025)
- August 19
  - Scott Brumfield, football player and coach
  - Fat Joe, rapper
  - Jeff Tam, baseball player
- August 20 – Fred Durst, singer/songwriter, rapper, and frontman for Limp Bizkit
- August 21
  - Milton Bell, basketball player
  - Chad Erickson, ice hockey player
- August 22 – Giada De Laurentiis, Italian-born chef
- August 23
  - Rob Bell, author, speaker, and pastor
  - Jay Mohr, actor and comedian
  - River Phoenix, actor, musician and activist (d. 1993)
- August 24
  - Rich Beem, golfer
  - Rob Bradley, politician
- August 25
  - Litza Bixler, American-born British choreographer
  - Duff Brumley, baseball player
  - Jo Dee Messina, singer
  - Sergio Vega, bassist for Deftones (2009-2021) and Quicksand
  - Setti Warren, politician (d. 2025)
- August 26 – Melissa McCarthy, actress, comedian, writer, producer and fashion designer
- August 27
  - luciana achugar, dancer and choreographer
  - Ann Aguirre, author
  - Geoff Byrd, musician
  - Tony Kanal, British-born songwriter, record producer, and bassist for No Doubt
  - Jim Thome, baseball player
- August 28 – Berit Brogaard, Danish-born philosopher
- August 29 – George Baldi III, a cappella singer
- August 31
  - Debbie Gibson, singer
  - Epic Mazur, singer and rapper

=== September ===
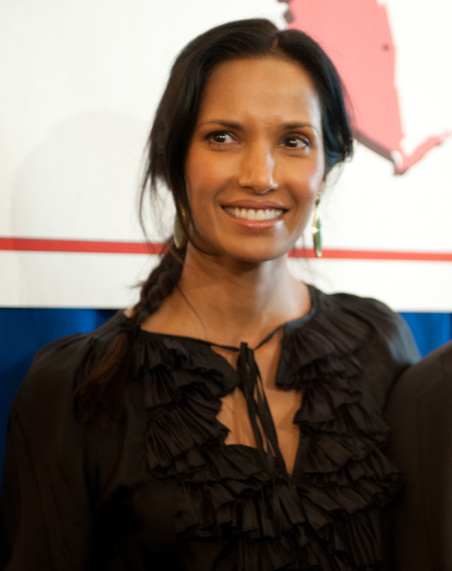
Padma Lakshmi

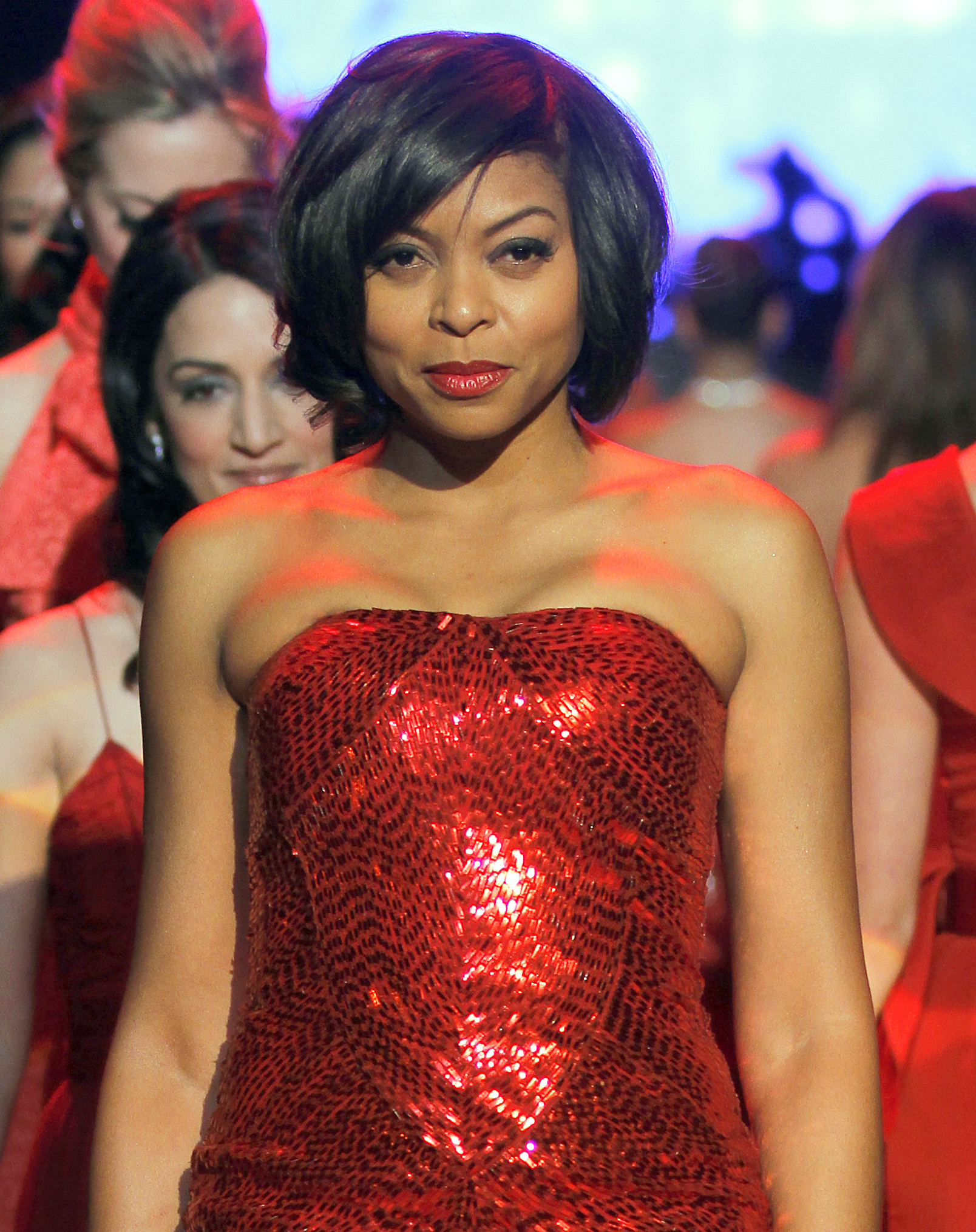
Taraji P. Henson

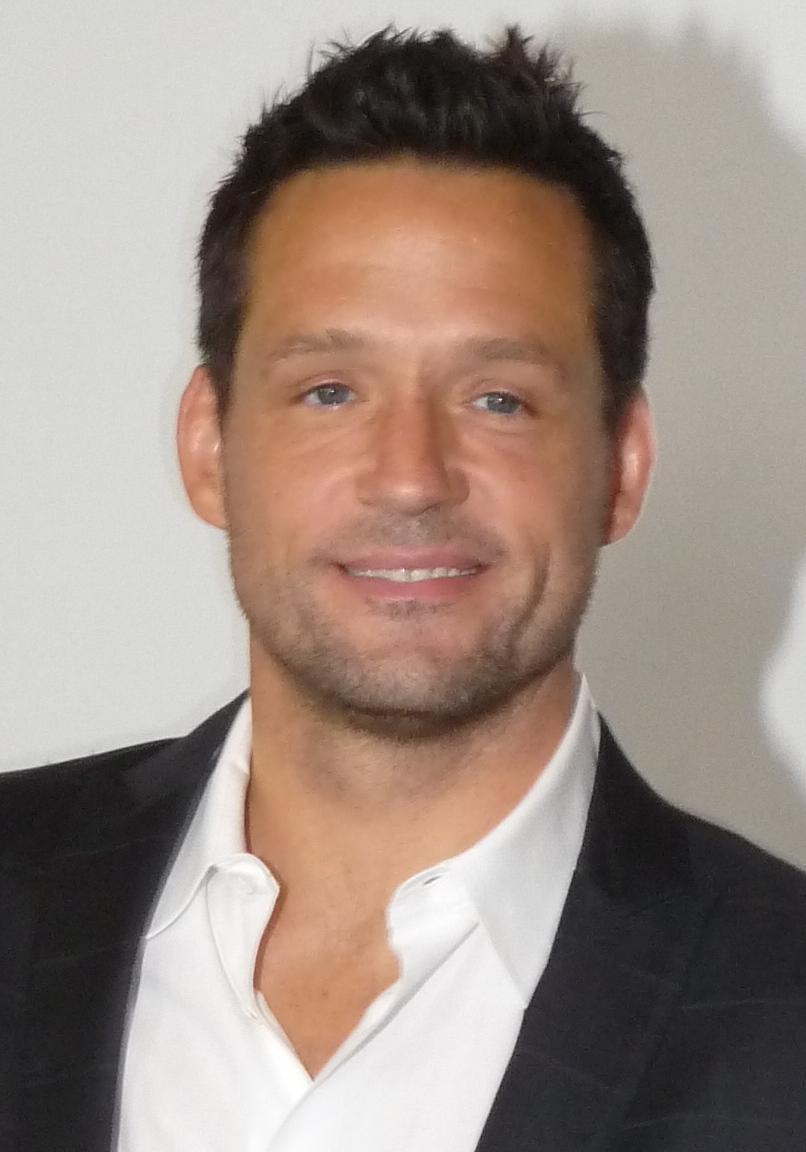
Josh Hopkins

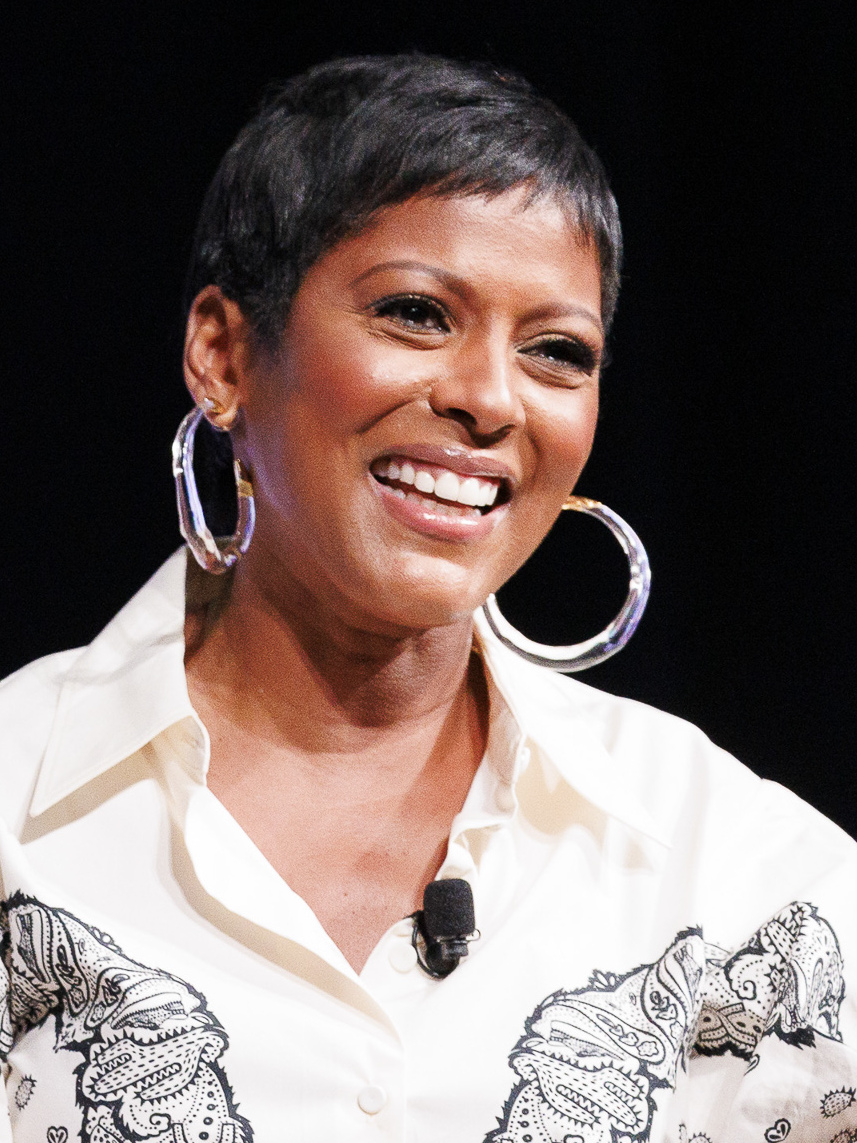
Tamron Hall

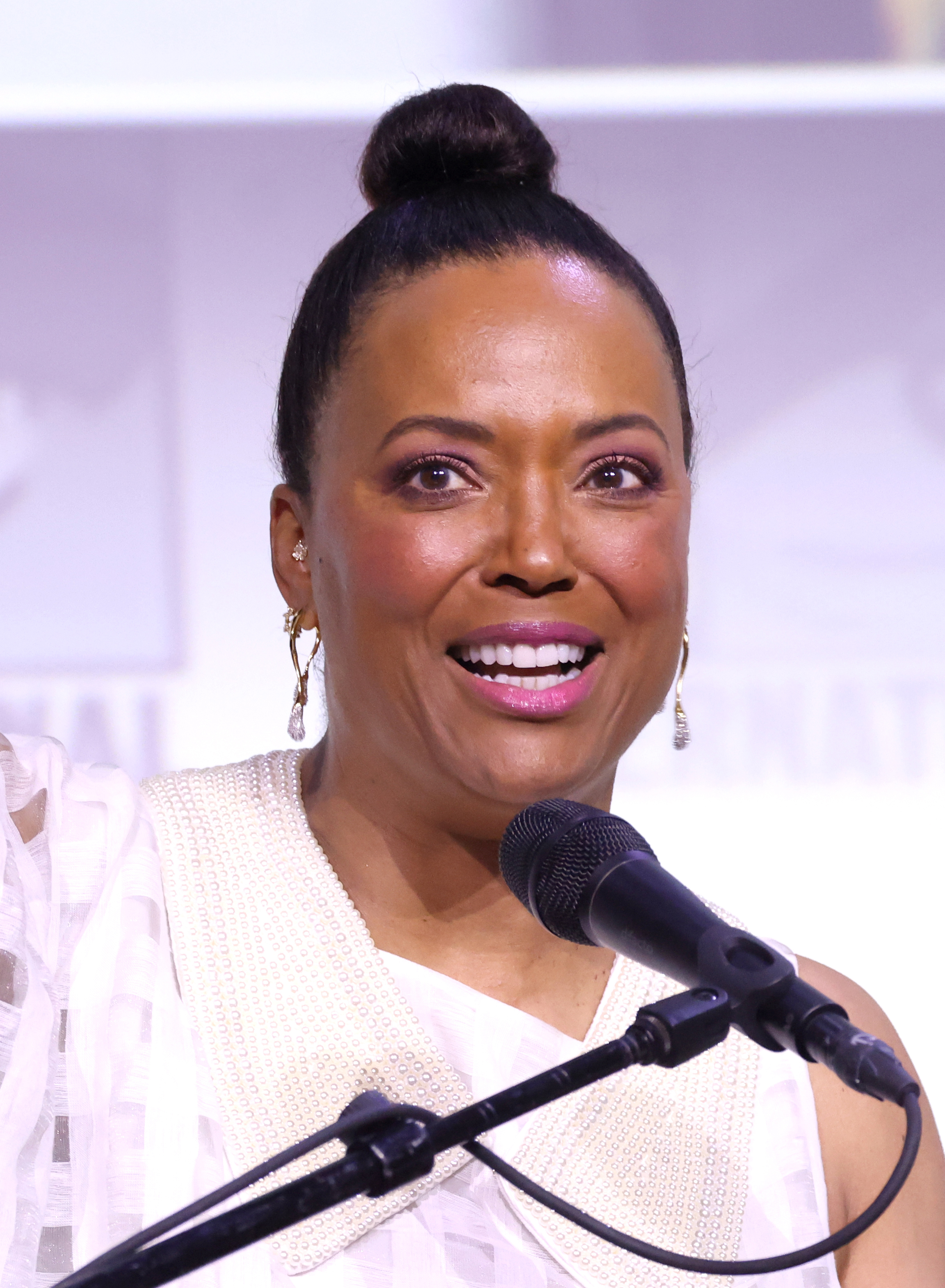
Aisha Tyler

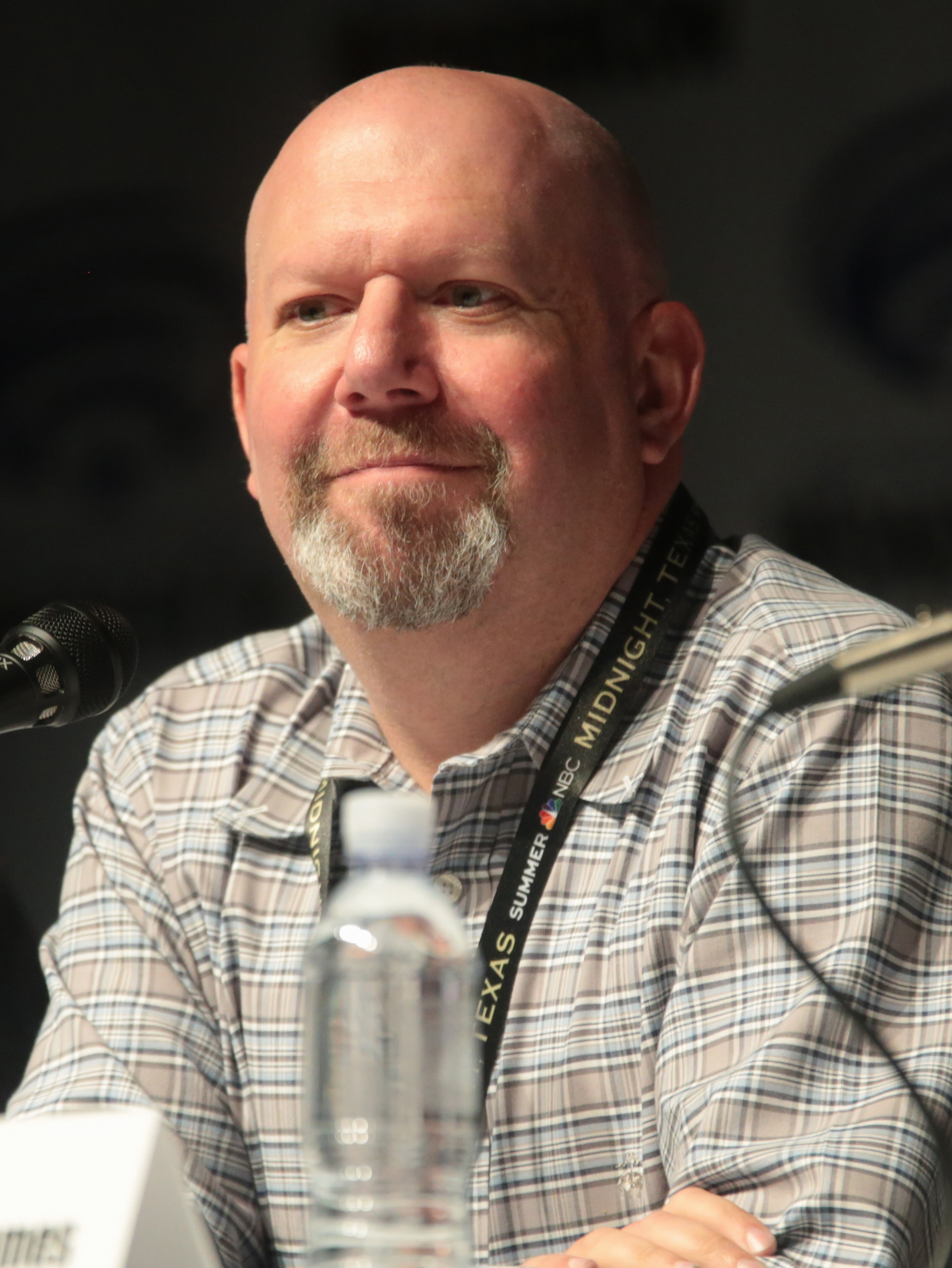
Marc Guggenheim

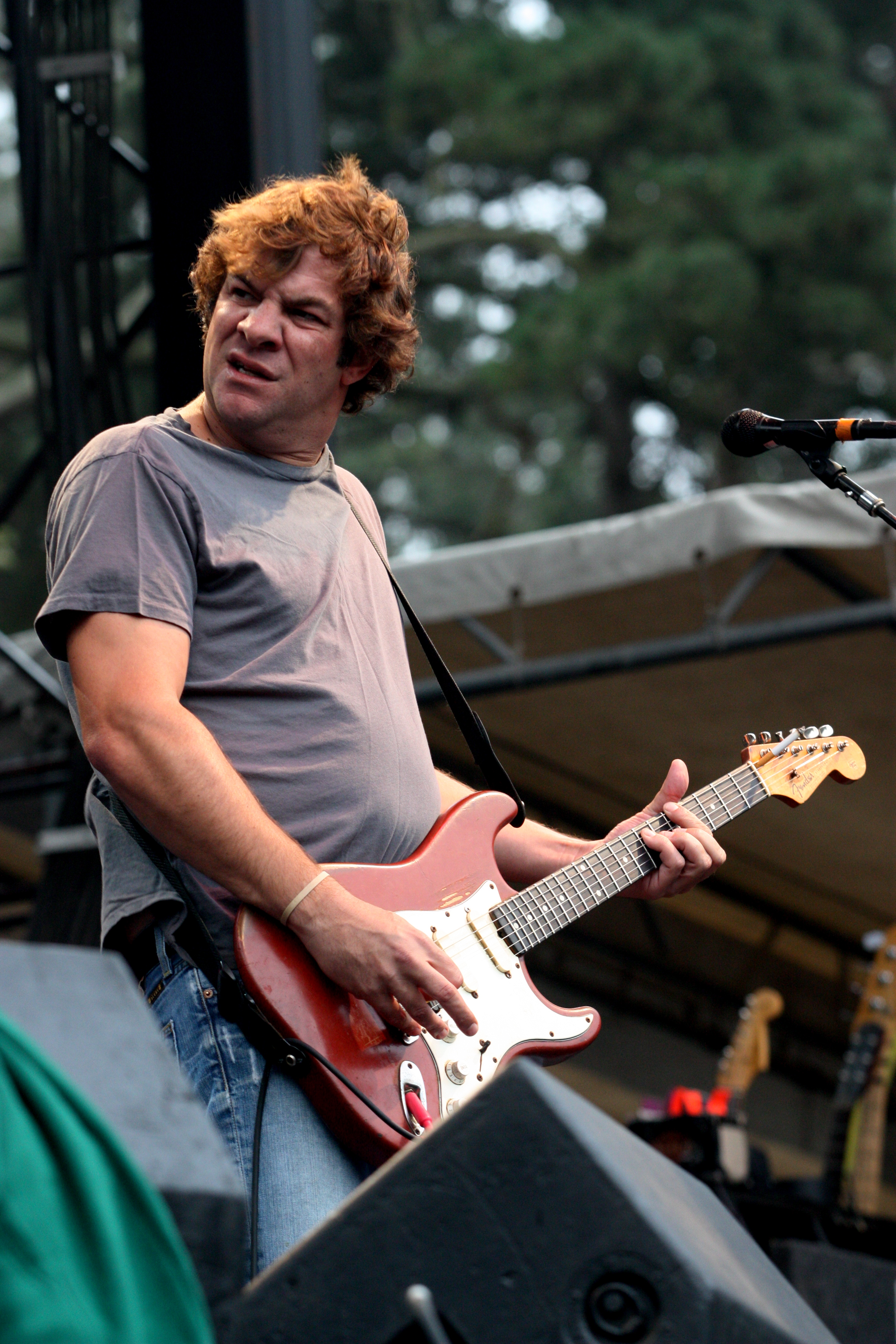
Dean Ween

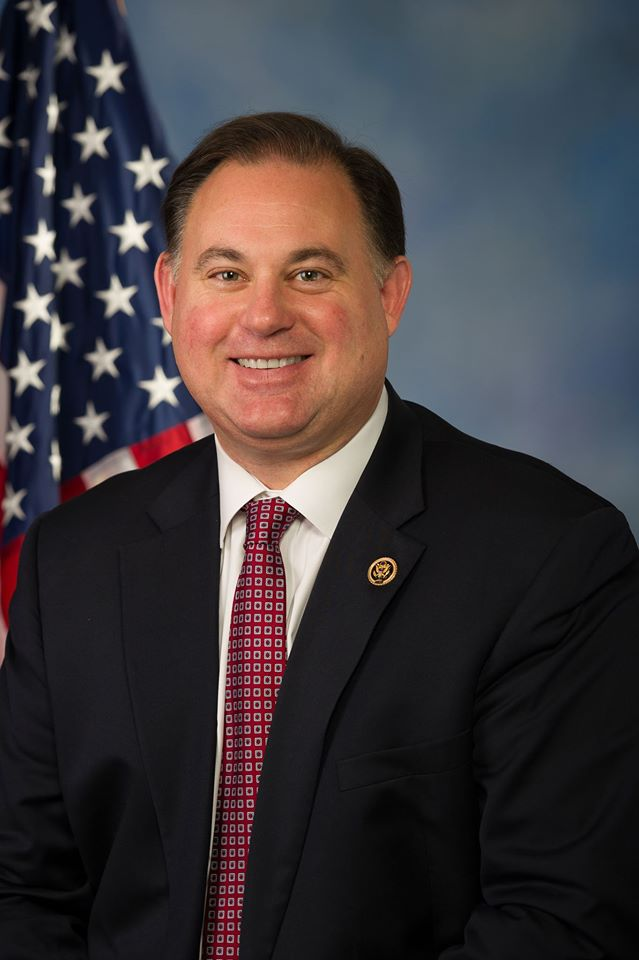
Frank Guinta

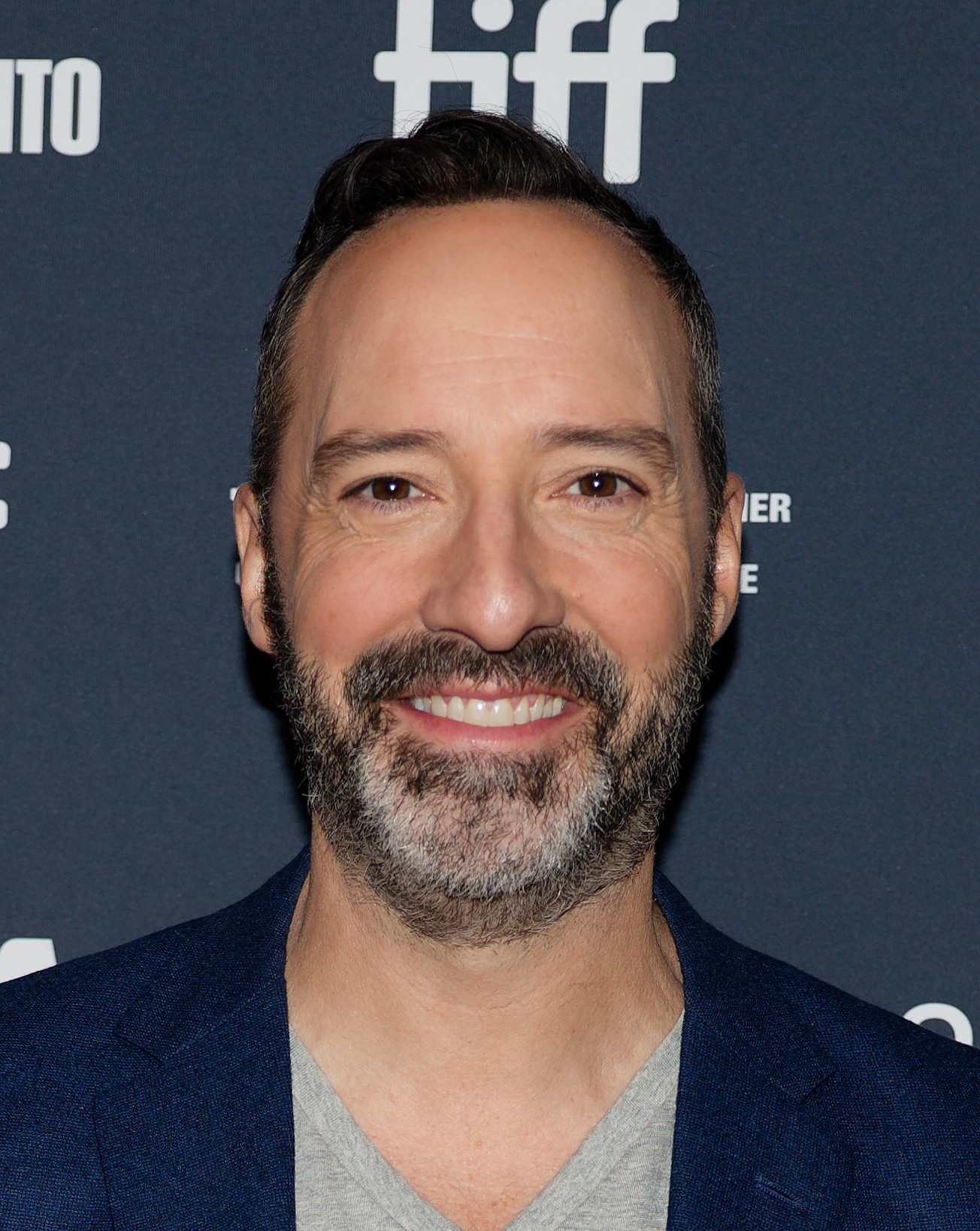
Tony Hale

- September 1
  - Joe Blakk, rapper
  - Clifton Bush, American-born New Zealand basketball player
  - Roland Gutierrez, politician
  - Padma Lakshmi, Indian-born author, activist, actress, and model
- September 2
  - Deral Boykin, football player
  - Jesse Burch, actor
- September 3
  - Maria Bamford, comedian and actress
  - Dave Berg, baseball player
  - Jeremy Glick, passenger on board United Airlines Flight 93 (d. 2001)
- September 4
  - Dave Buchwald, filmmaker and hacker
  - John Garcia, singer/songwriter
  - Ione Skye, British-born actress
- September 5 – Michael Akers, director, producer, screenwriter, and editor
- September 6 – Ant, hip hop producer
- September 7
  - Jay Adelson, internet entrepreneur
  - Bryan Bridgewater, sprinter
  - Tom Everett Scott, actor
- September 8
  - Tomur Barnes, football player
  - Nidal Hasan, US Army Major and mass murderer, perpetrator of the 2009 Fort Hood shooting
  - Rosearik Rikki Simons, voice actor
  - Latrell Sprewell, basketball player
- September 9 – William Boyland Jr., politician and convicted felon
- September 10
  - John Asimakopoulos, sociologist, author, and University professor
  - Molly McKay, attorney and LGBT activist
- September 11
  - Jules Boykoff, academic, author, and poet
  - Taraji P. Henson, actress, singer and author
  - William Joppy, boxer and coach
  - Ted Leo, singer/songwriter and guitarist
  - Dan Quinn, American football coach
  - Laura Wright, actress
- September 12 – Josh Hopkins, actor
- September 13
  - Lee Abramson, composer and musician (d. 2016)
  - Devin Boyd, basketball player
- September 14
  - Roger Bennett, British-born broadcaster, podcaster, and filmmaker
  - Mike Burns, soccer player
  - Robert Ben Garant, actor, comedian, screenwriter, producer, and director
  - Stephen Bishop, actor and baseball player
  - Ketanji Brown Jackson, judge and justice for the U.S. Supreme Court
- September 15 – Eric Garner, martyr to the New York City Police Department
- September 16
  - Taalam Acey, spoken-word artist
  - Stan Boyd, stock car racing driver
  - Jerone Davison, football player and political candidate
  - Tamron Hall, journalist and TV talk show host
- September 17
  - Ashley Ambrose, football player and coach
  - Jose Baez, lawyer and author
  - Jean-Robert Bellande, poker player
  - Mark Brunell, football player and coach
- September 18 – Aisha Tyler, actress, author, producer, writer, director, and talk show host
- September 19
  - Tim Breaux, basketball player
  - Dan Bylsma, ice hockey player
  - Victor Williams, actor
- September 20
  - Vaea Anitoni, rugby player
  - Raymond Arroyo, author, journalist, and producer
  - Patty Bentley, politician
- September 21
  - Rob Benedict, actor and writer
  - Samantha Power, diplomat
- September 22
  - Scot Armstrong, screenwriter, director, and producer
  - Mike Matheny, baseball player
  - Mystikal, rapper
  - Chris Tallman, actor and comedian
- September 23
  - Patrick Allen, bowler
  - Percy Bland, politician
  - Ed Book, American-born New Zealand basketball player
  - Ani DiFranco, American-born Canadian musician
- September 24
  - Glenn Allen Jr., racing driver and co-owner of Allen-Hock Motorsports
  - Curtis Blair, basketball player and referee
  - Marc Guggenheim, screenwriter, producer, comic book writer, and novelist
  - Malinda Williams, actress and producer
- September 25
  - David Benioff, producer and director
  - Curtis Buckley, football player
  - Dean Ween, guitarist and vocalist for Ween
- September 26 – Frank Guinta, politician
- September 28
  - Brian Banks, baseball player
  - Thomas J. Brown, bishop
- September 29
  - AMG, rapper
  - Luke Bodensteiner, Olympic skier
  - Natasha Gregson Wagner, actress
- September 30
  - Aceyalone, rapper
  - Rob Boras, football coach
  - Tony Hale, actor and comedian

=== October ===
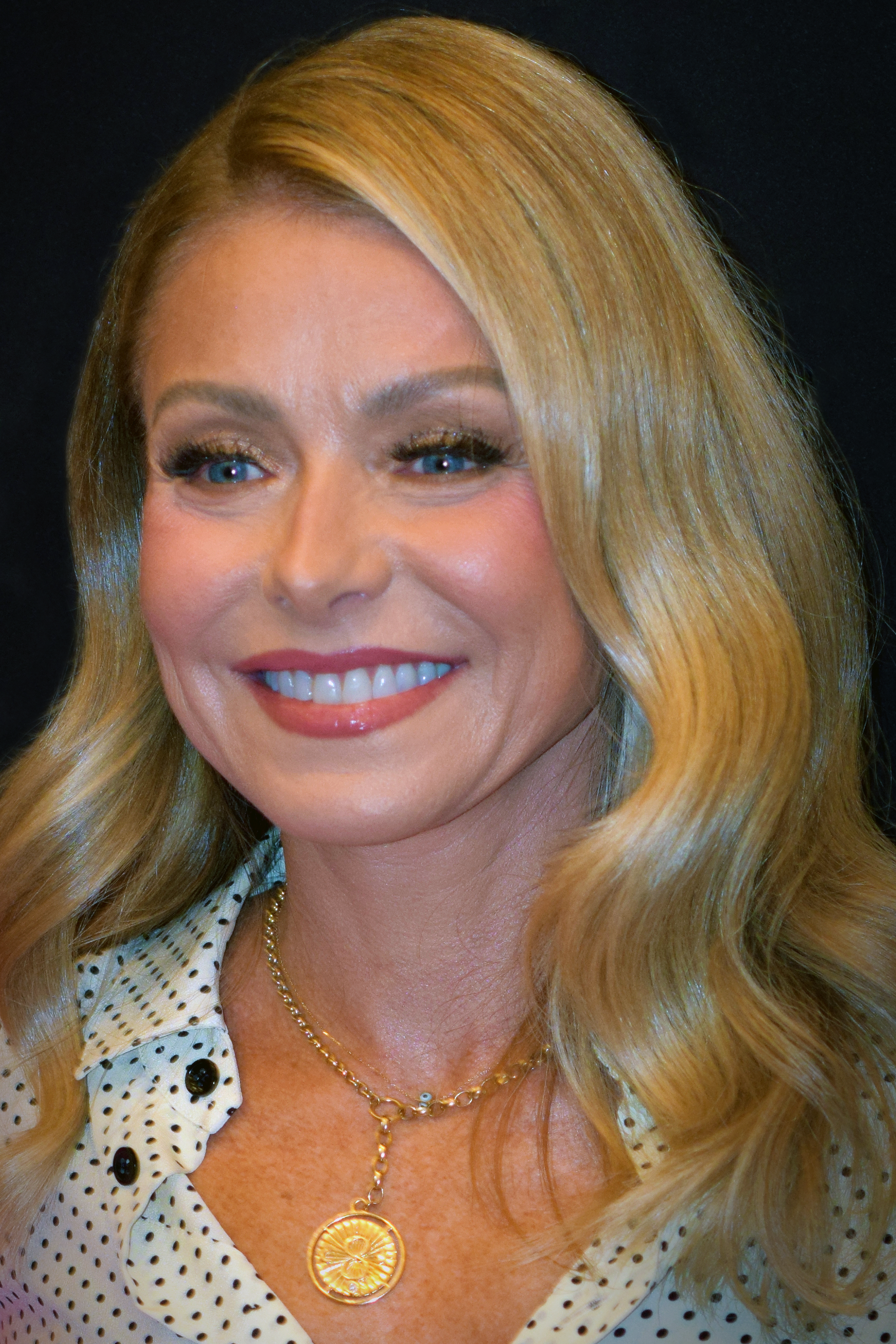
Kelly Ripa

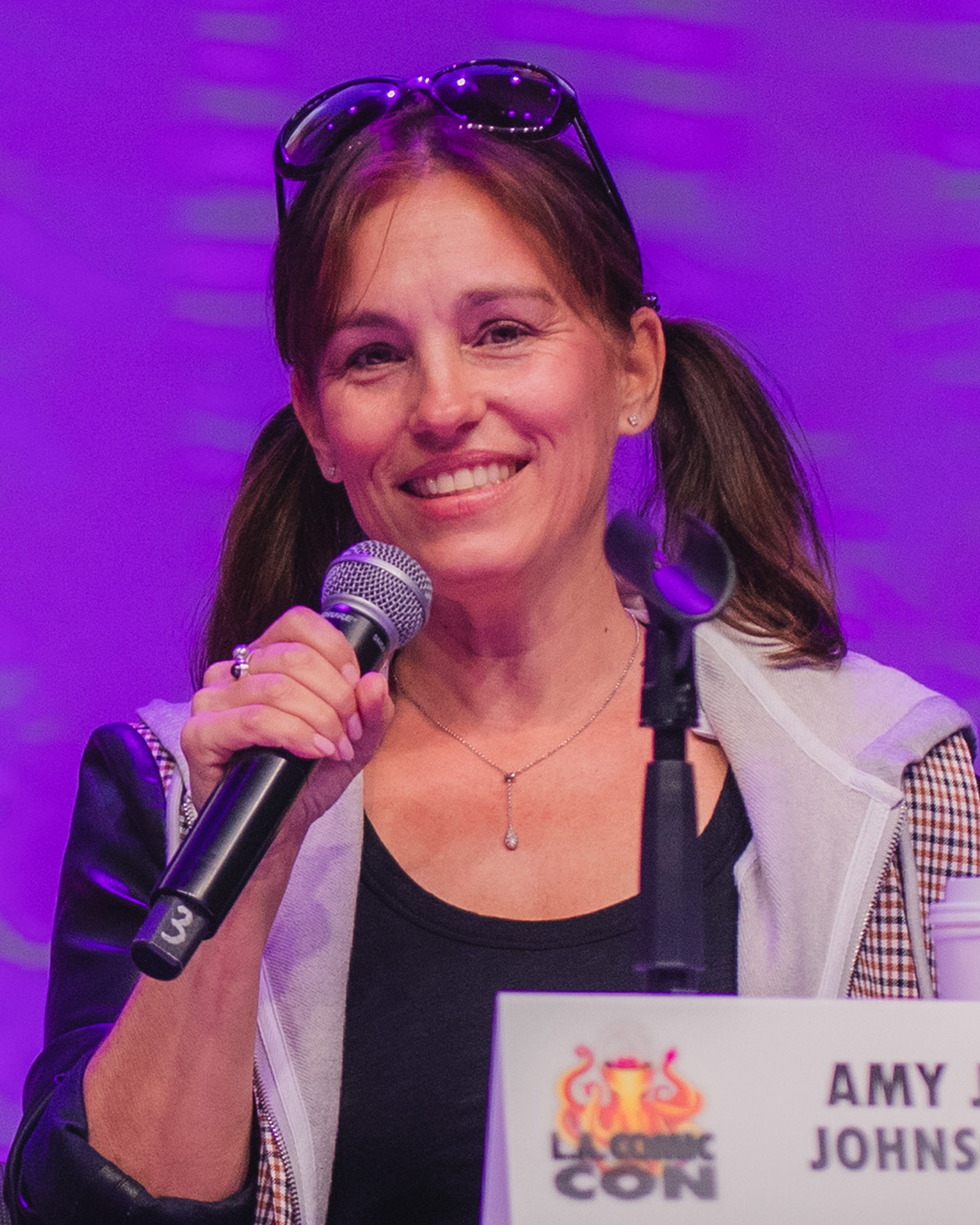
Amy Jo Johnson

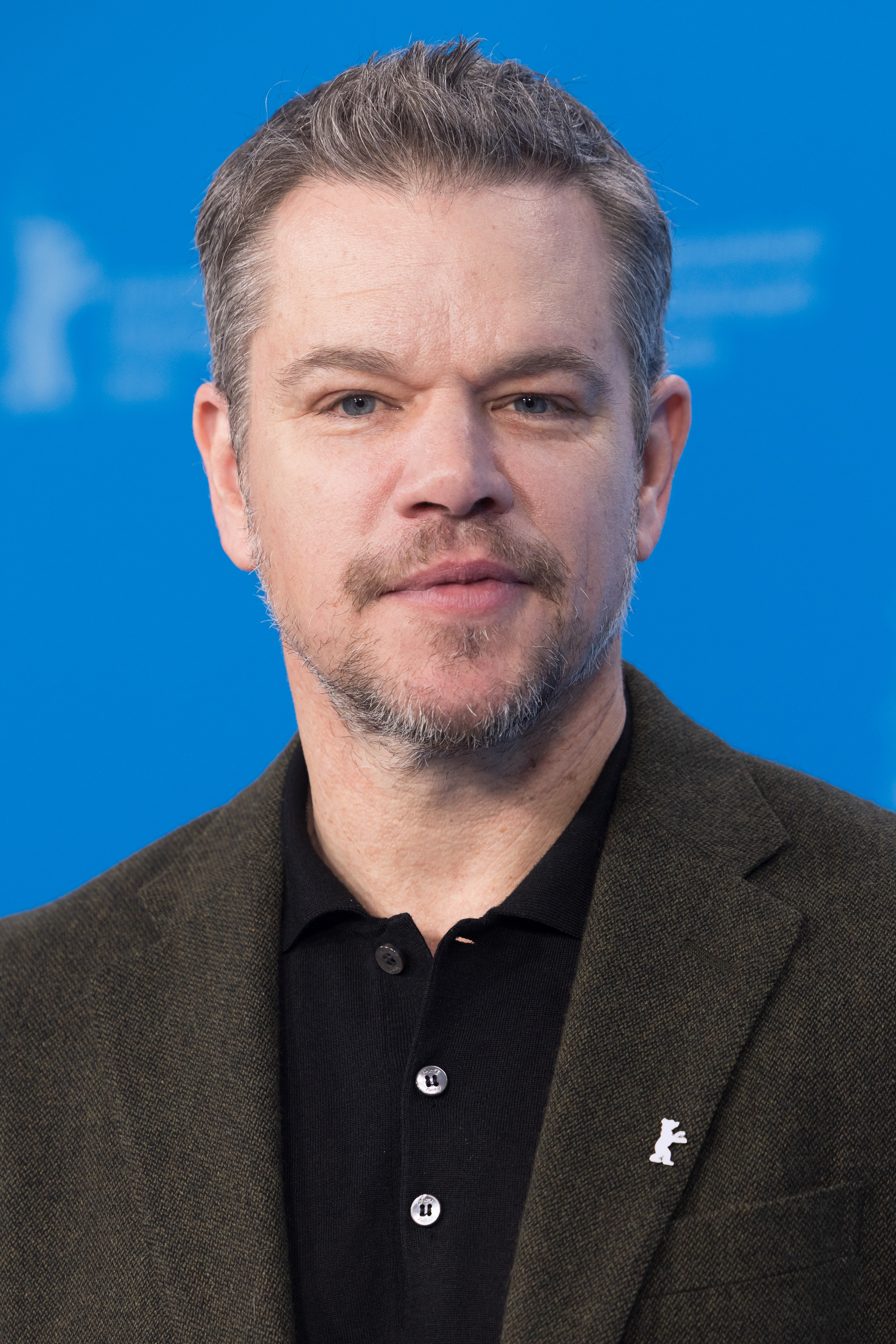
Matt Damon

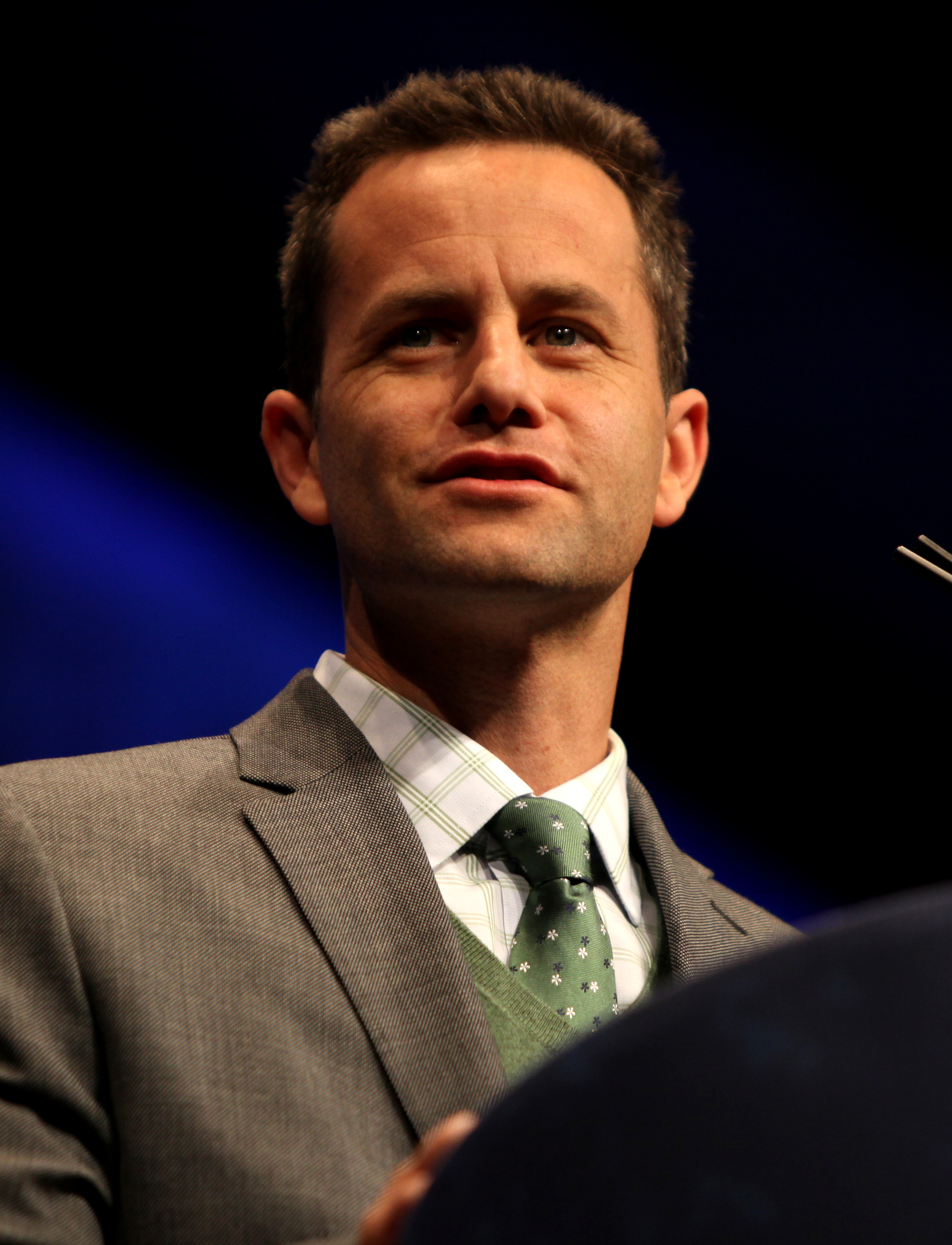
Kirk Cameron

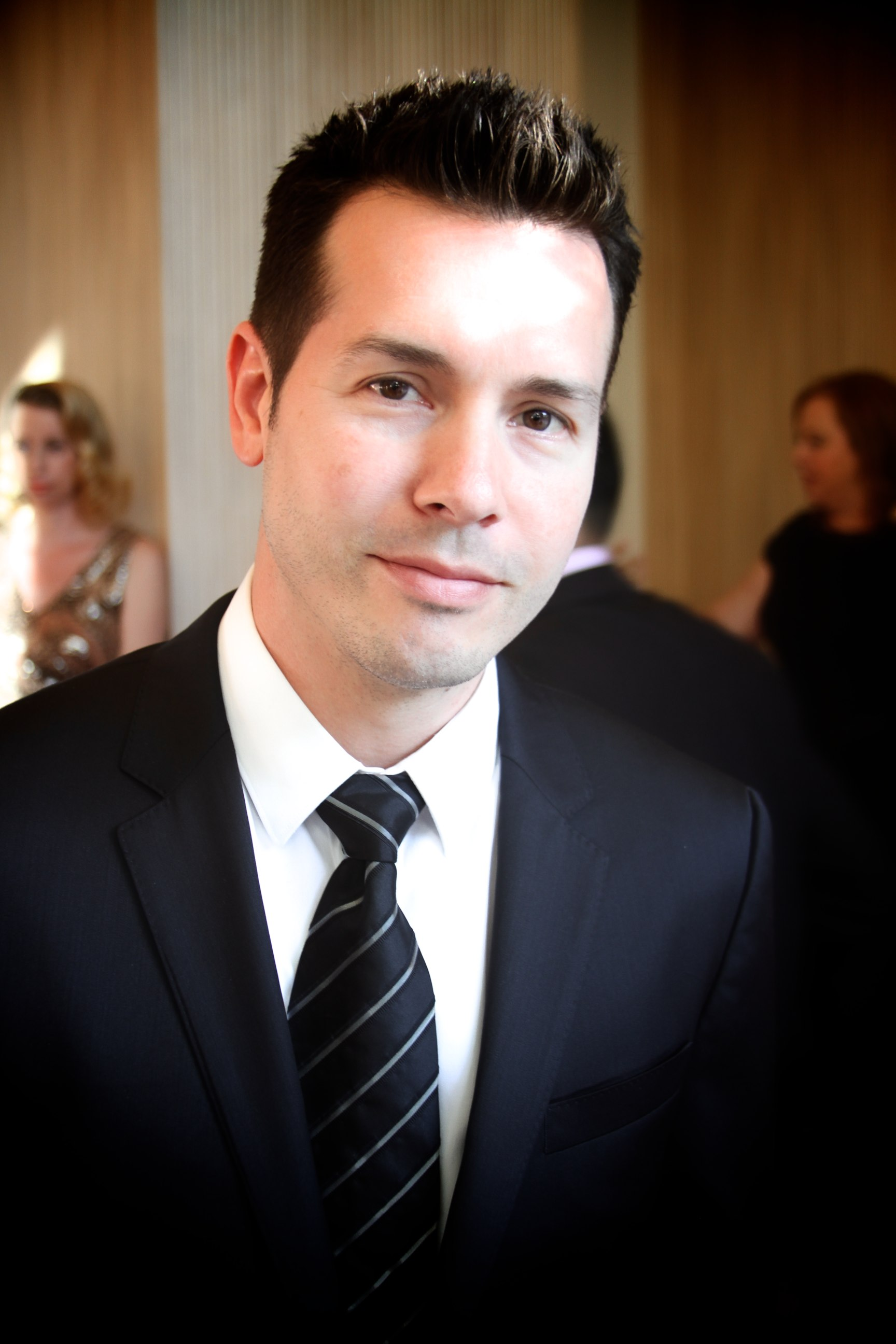
Jon Seda

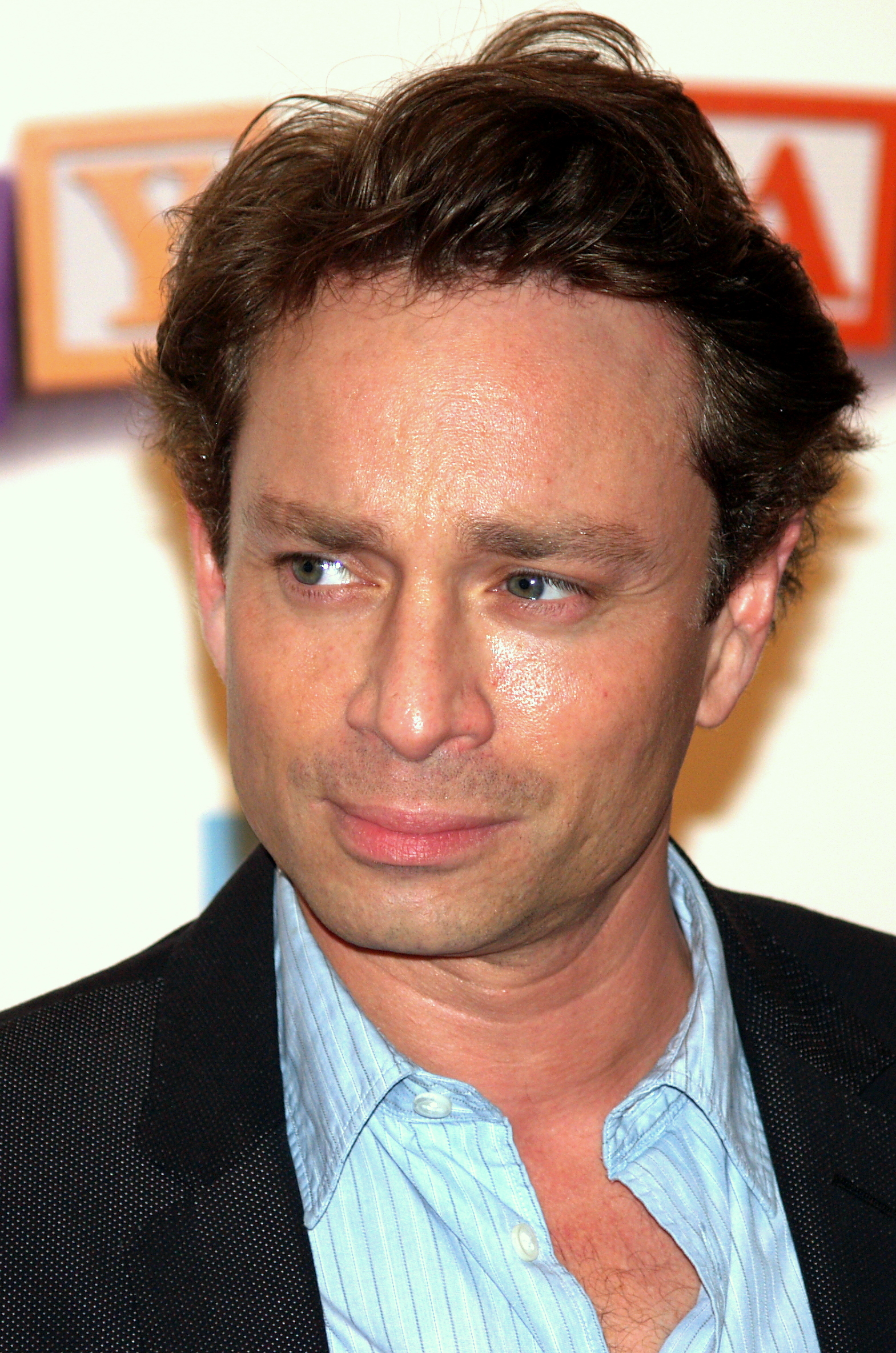
Chris Kattan

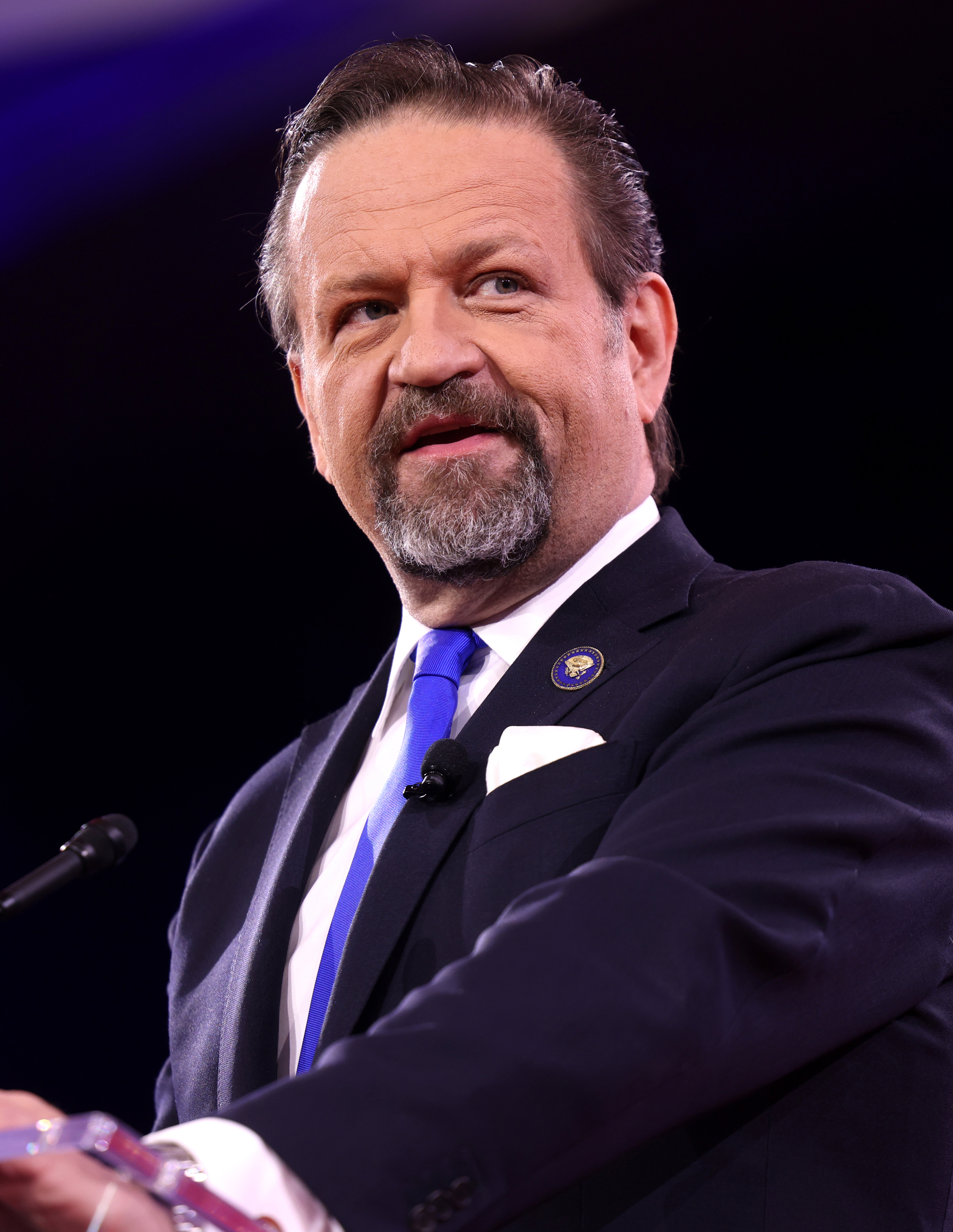
Sebastian Gorka

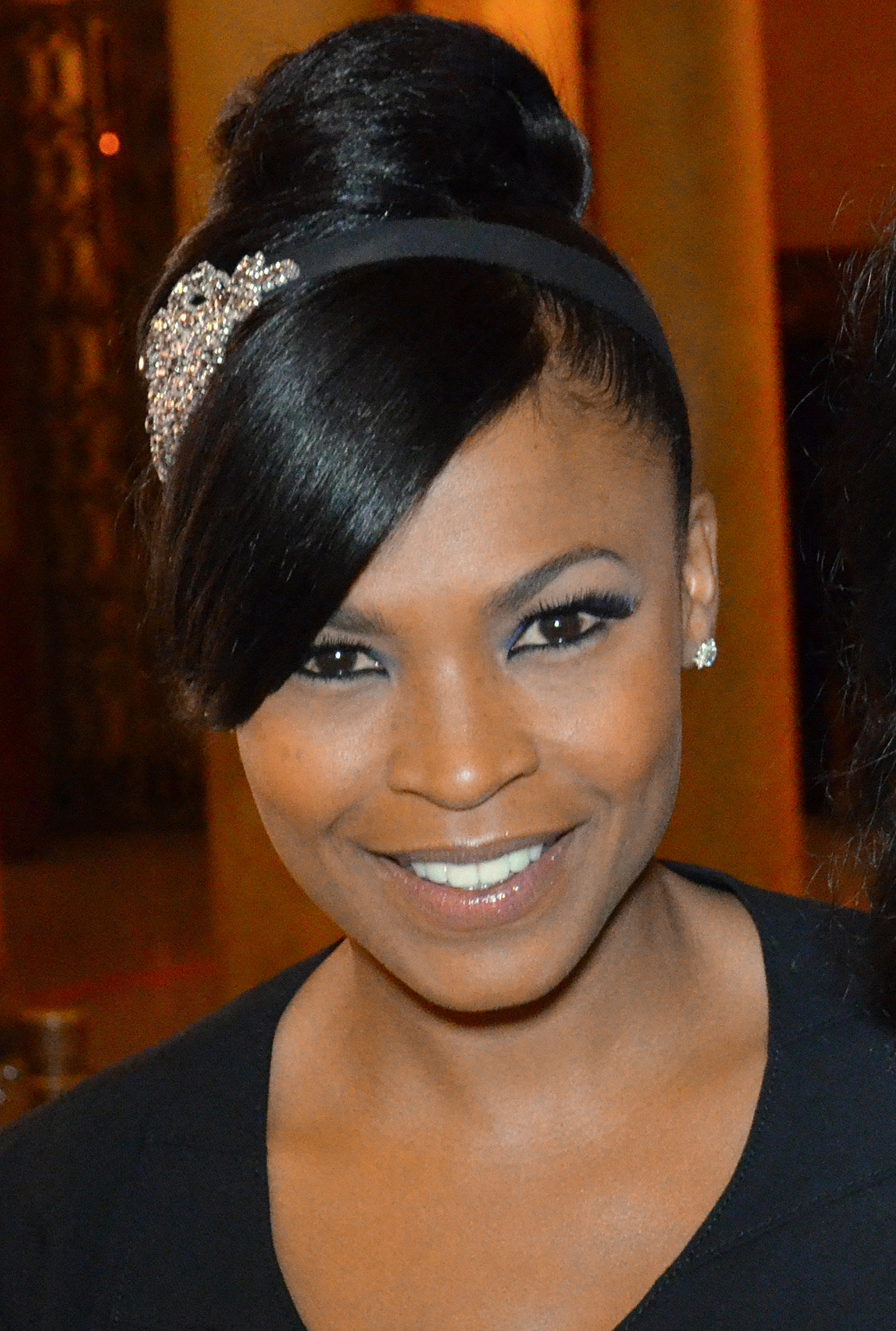
Nia Long

- October 1
  - Adele Anthony, Singaporean-born Australian-American violinist
  - Blake Nelson Boyd, actor, comedian, and visual artist
  - Ronnie Bradford, football player
  - Krucial, hip hop artist
  - Marne Levine, businesswoman
- October 2
  - Quisi Bryan, convicted murderer
  - Tim Moore, politician
  - Kelly Ripa, actress and TV personality
  - Karl Smesko, basketball coach
- October 3
  - Tyji Armstrong, football player
  - Roger Bailey, baseball player
- October 5
  - Josie Bissett, actress
  - Audie Pitre, singer and bass player (d. 1997)
- October 6 – Amy Jo Johnson, actress
- October 7 – Nicole Ari Parker, actress and model
- October 8
  - Mark Buford, basketball player
  - Matt Damon, actor
- October 9
  - Kenny Anderson, basketball player
  - David Benkof, American-born Israeli political commentator
  - Lorna Breen, physician (d. 2020)
  - Jason Butler Harner, actor
- October 11
  - Chidi Ahanotu, football player
  - Charles Arthur Berg, producer and actor
- October 12
  - Herman Arvie, football player
  - Kirk Cameron, actor and Christian activist
  - Hillary Schieve, politician, mayor of Reno, Nevada (2014–present)
  - Charlie Ward, football and basketball player
- October 13
  - Serena Altschul, journalist
  - Kwame R. Brown, politician
  - Marty Jackley, attorney and politician
  - Mel Jackson, actor
- October 14 – Jon Seda, actor
- October 15
  - Reid Anderson, bassist and composer
  - Ginuwine, R&B singer/songwriter, dancer, and actor
  - Chris Mims, football player (d. 2008)
- October 18
  - Mahdi Abu-Omar, Israeli-born chemist and University professor
  - Shane Bonham, football player
  - Jose Padilla, convicted terrorist
- October 19 – Chris Kattan, comedian and actor
- October 20
  - Harold Alexander, football player
  - Michelle Malkin, political commentator
- October 22
  - D'Lo Brown, wrestler
  - Sebastian Gorka, British-born Hungarian-American media personality
- October 23
  - Matthew Barzun, diplomat and businessman
  - Bruce Kennedy, producer, screenwriter, and director
- October 25
  - Jon Bunch, singer/songwriter and frontman for Sense Field and Further Seems Forever (d. 2016)
  - Adam Goldberg, actor, filmmaker, musician, and photographer
- October 26
  - Jessie Armstead, football player
  - Dian Bachar, actor
  - David Beaty, football coach
  - Monica Brant, bodybuilder and fitness competitor
  - Chavo Guerrero Jr., wrestler
- October 27 – Chuck Belin, football player
- October 28
  - Ayad Akhtar, playwright, novelist, and screenwriter
  - Anthony Bonsante, boxer
  - Greg Eagles, actor and voice actor
- October 29 – Alex Beard, artist
- October 30
  - Ben Bailey, comedian and game show host
  - Tory Bellici, television personality and model maker
  - Adelita Grijalva, politician
  - Kevin Johnson, football player (d. 2026)
  - Nia Long, actress
- October 31
  - Ray Austin, boxer
  - Steve Bencich, screenwriter and director
  - Nolan North, actor and voice-over artist

=== November ===
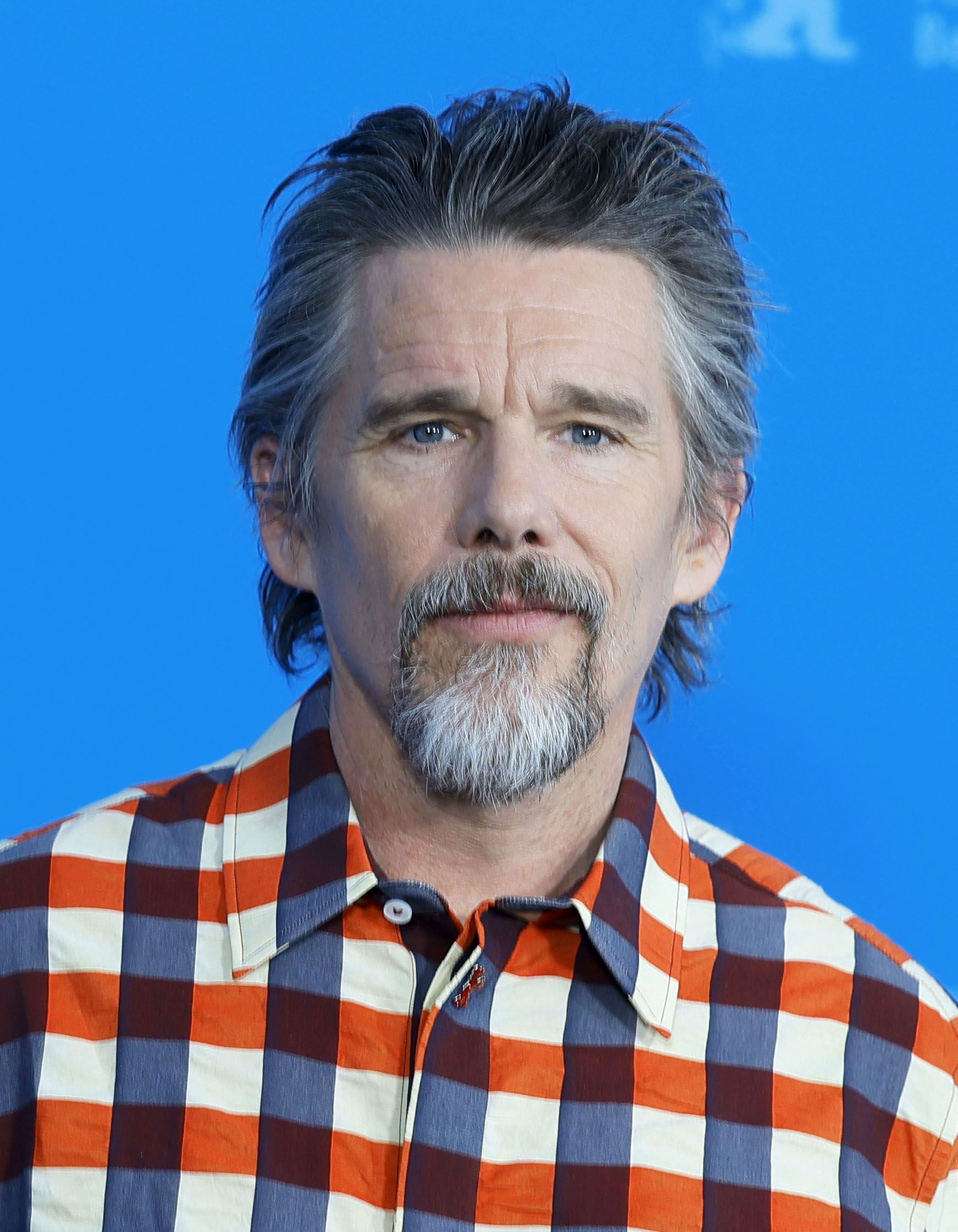
Ethan Hawke

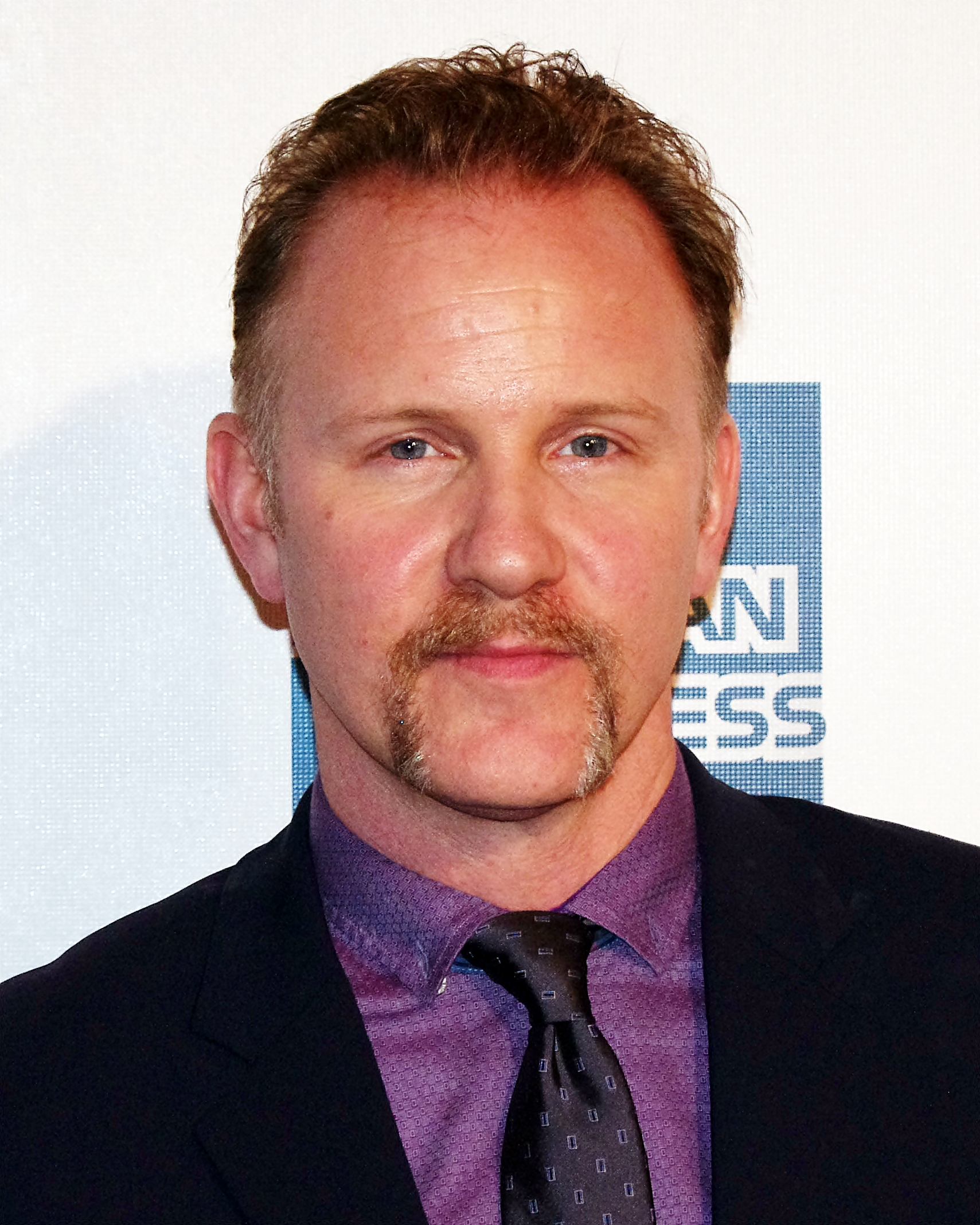
Morgan Spurlock

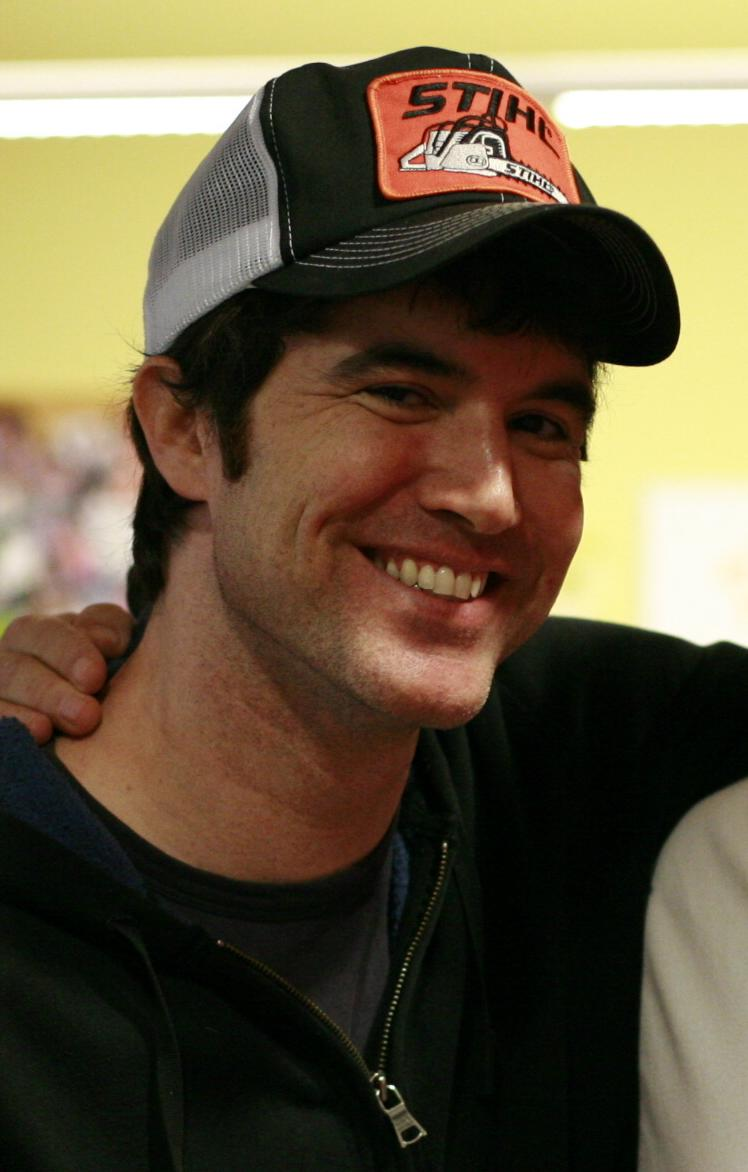
Tom Anderson

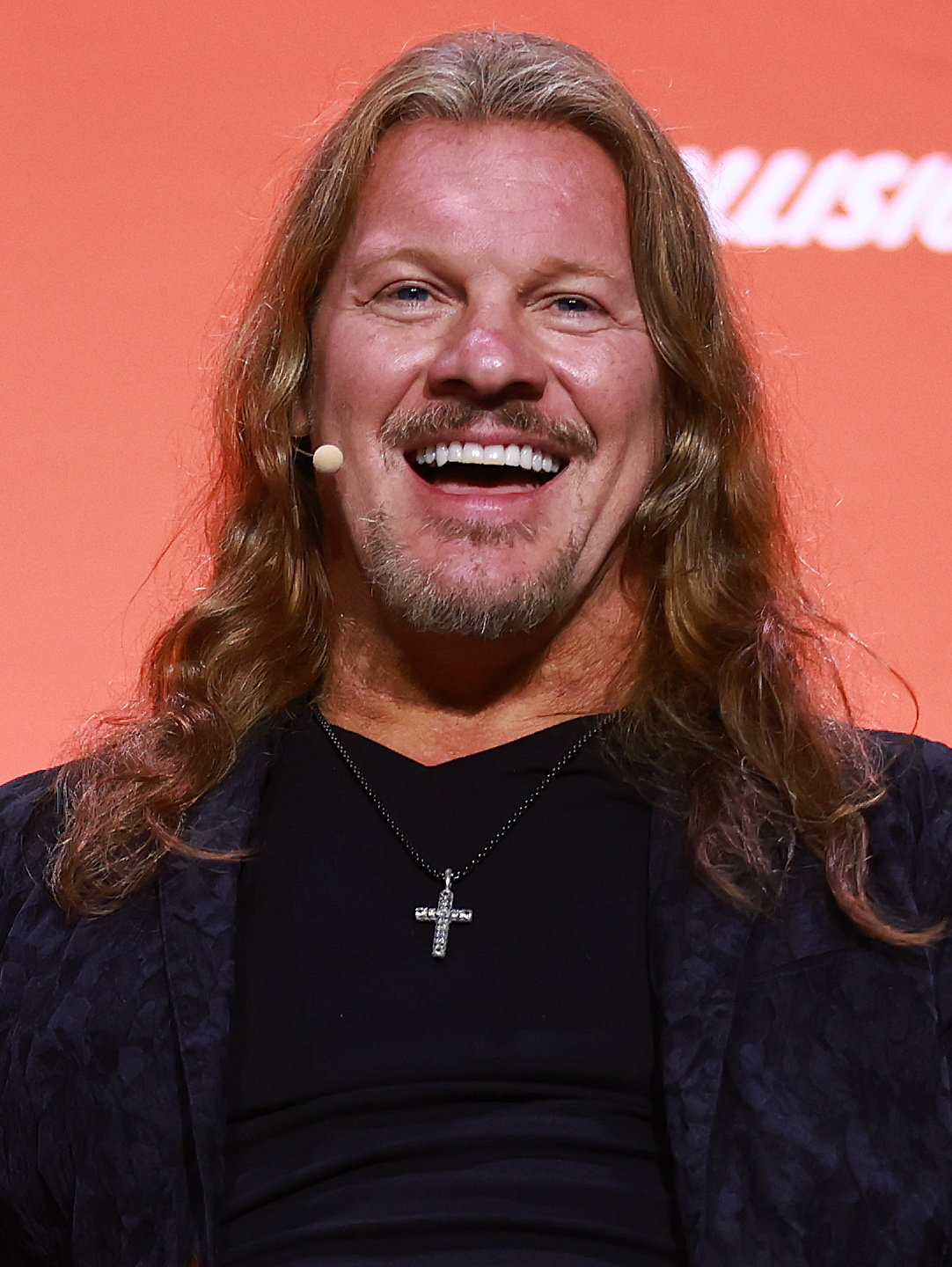
Chris Jericho

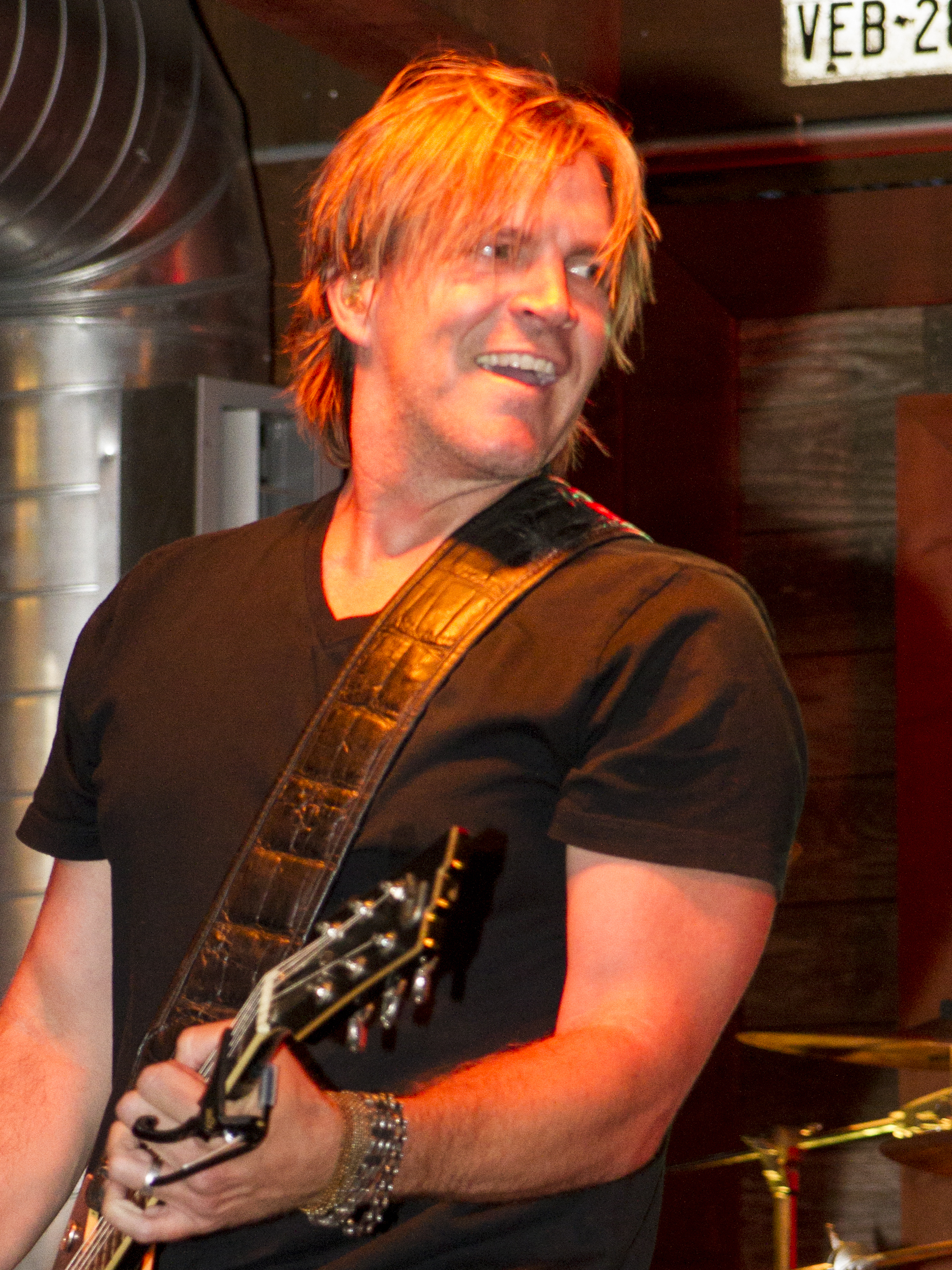
Jack Ingram

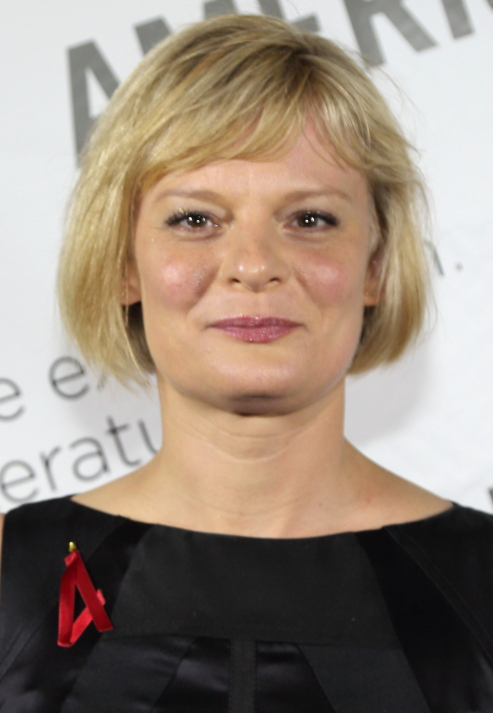
Martha Plimpton

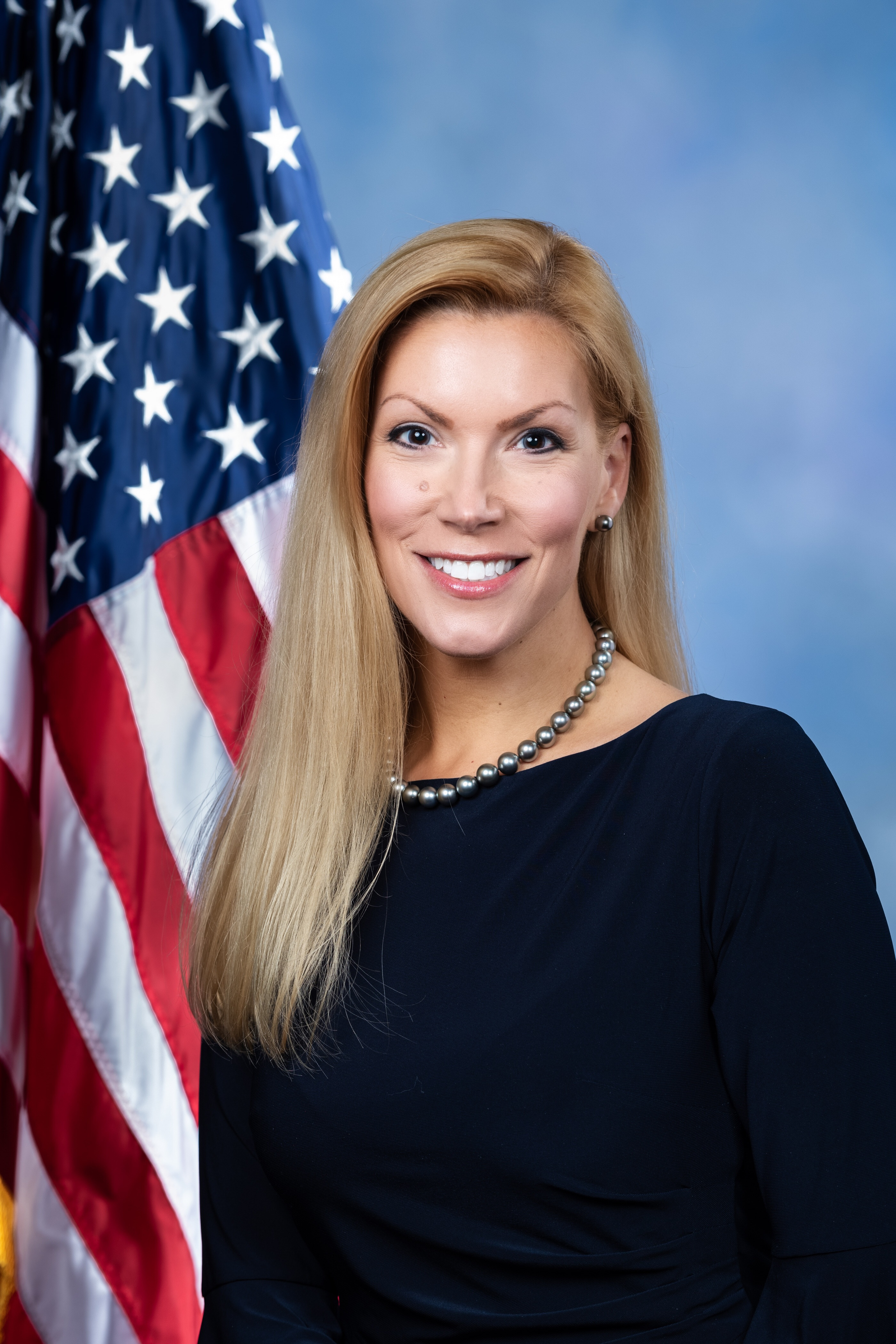
Beth Van Duyne

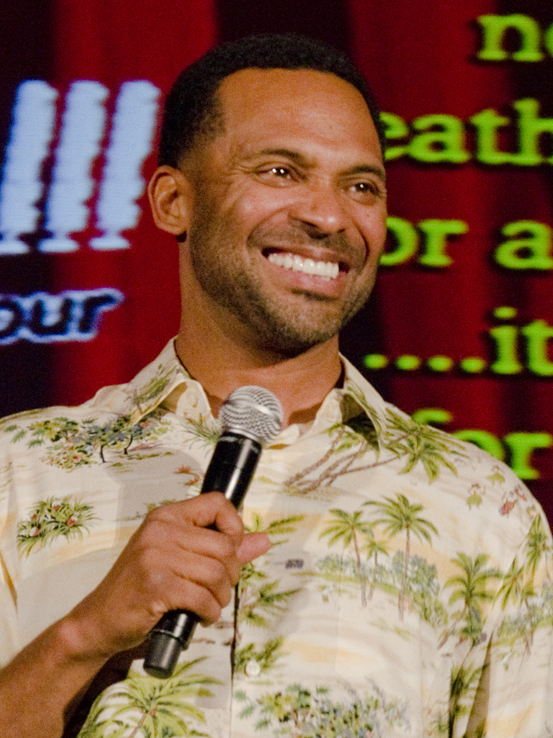
Mike Epps

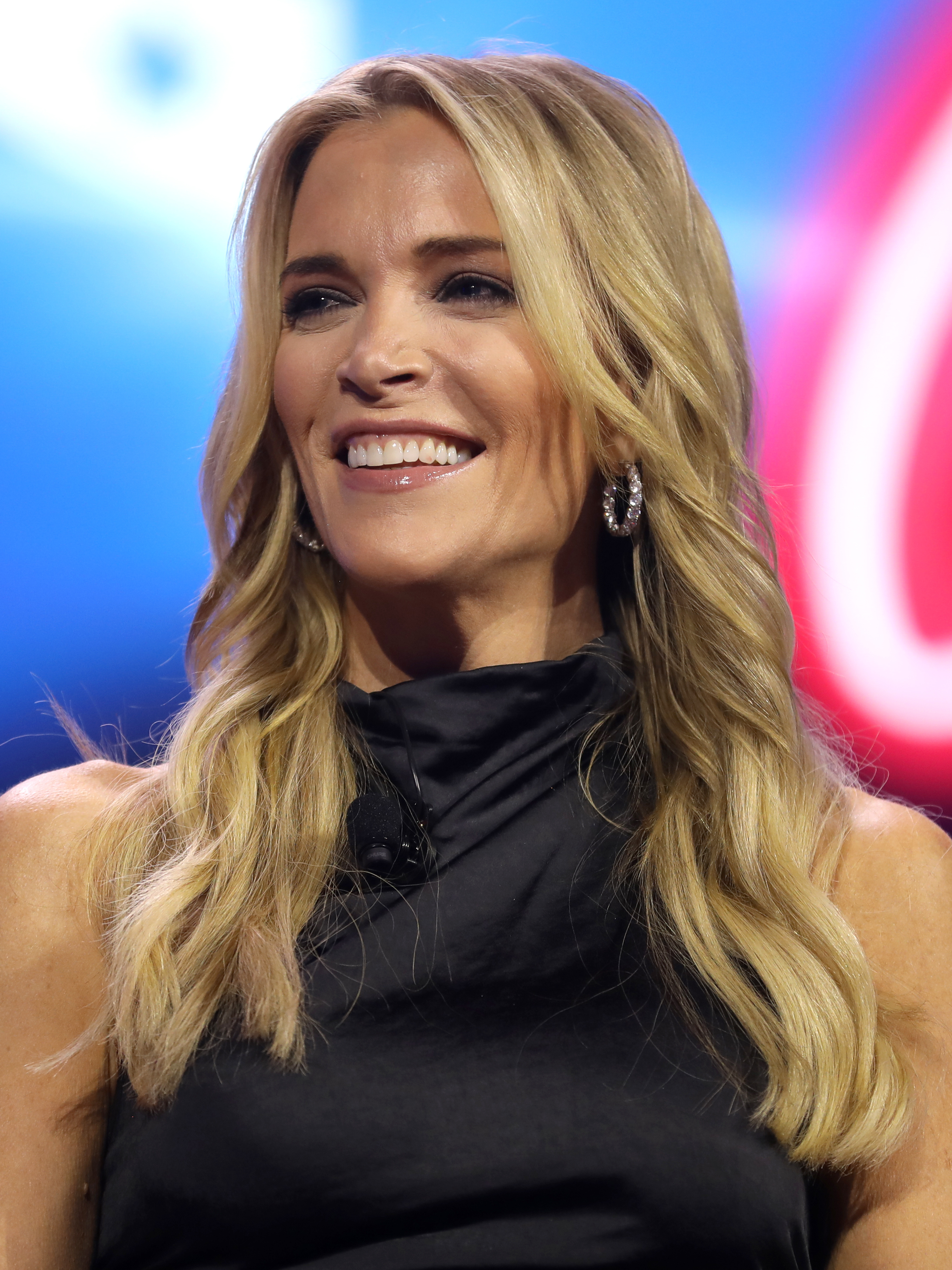
Megyn Kelly

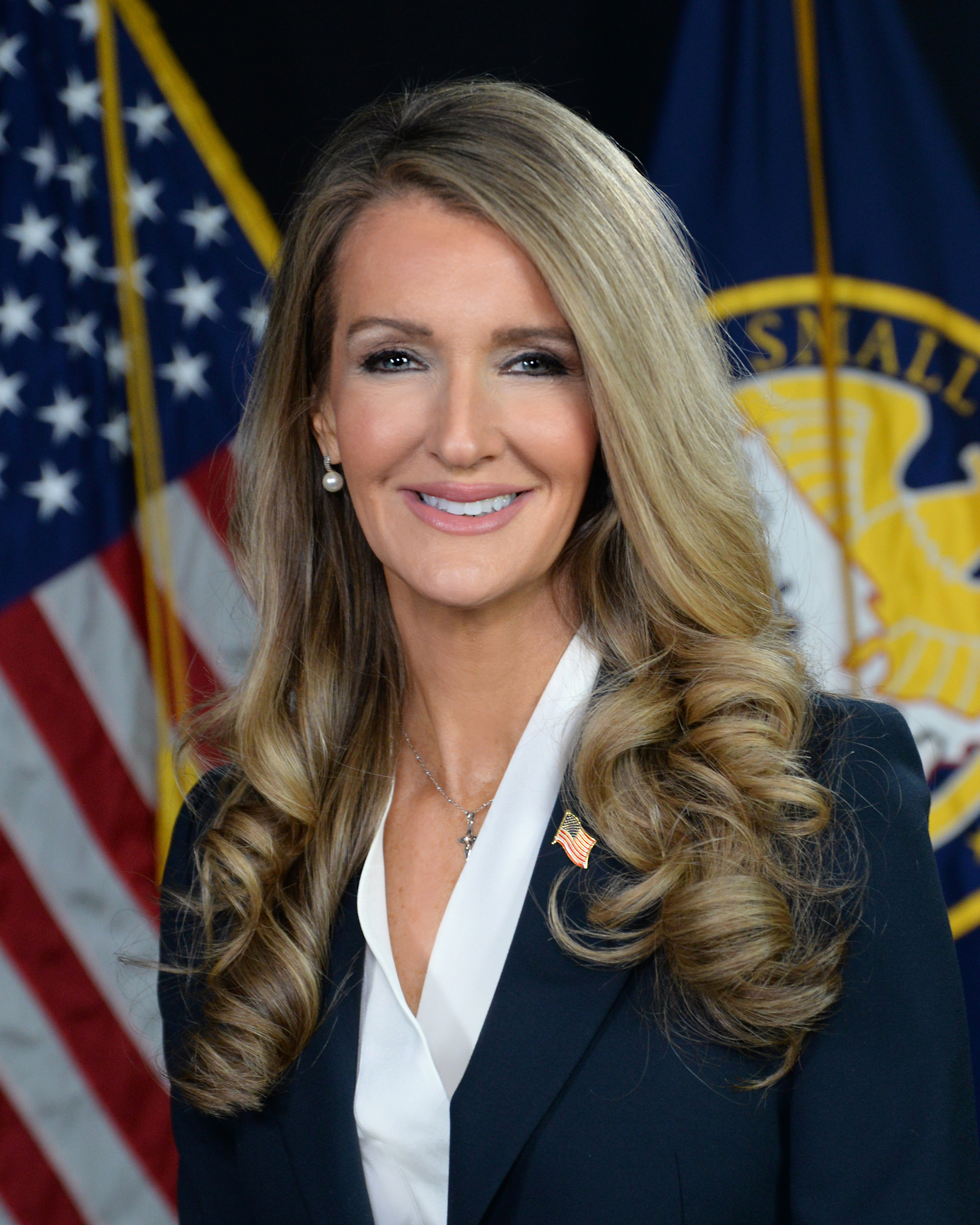
Kelly Loeffler

- November 1 – Corey Barlow, football player
- November 2 – Sharmell, wrestling valet
- November 3 – Dawn Marie Psaltis, wrestler
- November 4
  - Su Su Bobien, gospel singer
  - Anthony Ruivivar, actor
  - Tony Sly, singer (d. 2012)
- November 5
  - Joe Aresimowicz, politician
  - Malik Boyd, football player and executive
  - Heather Pick, television news anchor (d. 2008)
- November 6
  - Bryant Anderson, wrestler
  - Jason Atkinson, politician
  - Rich Braham, football player
  - Ethan Hawke, actor
- November 7
  - Chris Adrian, author
  - Mo Alexander, comedian
  - Morgan Spurlock, filmmaker and activist (d. 2024)
- November 8 – Tom Anderson, internet entrepreneur, co-founder of Myspace
- November 9
  - Gordon Bellamy, video game executive
  - Jordan Black, actor and writer
  - Chris Jericho, American-born Canadian wrestler
  - Scarface, rapper
  - Dan Schlissel, record producer
- November 10
  - Orny Adams, comedian
  - Michael Berry, radio talk show host
  - Trent Dimas, Olympic gymnast
  - Vince Vieluf, actor
  - Warren G, rapper
- November 11
  - Chip Brian, entrepreneur
  - Cameron Sexton, politician
- November 12
  - Orlando Brown, football player (d. 2011)
  - Darcy Burner, businesswoman and politician
  - Tonya Harding, Olympic figure skater
- November 13
  - Chad Bannon, actor
  - Trenton Boykin, football player and coach
  - Jeff Brown, basketball player
- November 14 – Brendan Benson, singer/songwriter and member of the Raconteurs
- November 15
  - Matthew Butterick, typographer, lawyer, writer, and computer programmer
  - Jack Ingram, country music singer
- November 16
  - Jamie Babbit, director, producer, and screenwriter
  - Dave Johnson, basketball player
  - Martha Plimpton, actress
  - Beth Van Duyne, politician, Mayor of Irving, Texas (2011–2017)
- November 18
  - Elizabeth Anne Allen, actress
  - Mike Epps, comedian and actor
  - Megyn Kelly, journalist and media personality
- November 19
  - Mark Abboud, soccer player
  - Jeff Berblinger, baseball player
  - Rickey Brady, football player
- November 20
  - Matt Blunt, politician
  - Angelica Bridges, actress, model, television host, producer, and singer
  - Rosemary Brown, politician
  - Phife Dawg, rapper for A Tribe Called Quest (d. 2016)
  - Joe Zaso, actor and producer
- November 21
  - Jonathan Greenblatt, CEO of the Anti-Defamation League
  - Tom Rooney, politician
- November 22
  - Jamie Arentzen, guitarist for American Hi-Fi
  - Leila Bela, Iranian-born musician and actress
  - Joe Son, South Korean-born actor, wrestler, and convicted felon
- November 23
  - Adrianne Byrd, author (d. 2020)
  - Oded Fehr, Israeli-born actor
- November 24
  - Doug Brien, football player
  - Julieta Venegas, American born-Mexican singer, guitarist, and producer
- November 26
  - Nate Albert, music executive, songwriter, producer, and guitarist
  - John Amaechi, American-born British psychologist, consultant, and basketball player
  - Kevin Brobson, lawyer and judge
- November 27
  - David August, computer scientist and University professor
  - Patrick Bates, football player
  - Calvin Jones, football player (d. 2025)
  - Mr. Lobo, television personality
  - Kelly Loeffler, politician
  - Erik Menendez, convicted murderer
- November 29
  - Susan Athey, economist
  - Larry Joe Campbell, actor and comedian
- November 30
  - Mario Bailey, football player
  - Walter Emanuel Jones, actor
  - Natalie Williams, basketball player

=== December ===
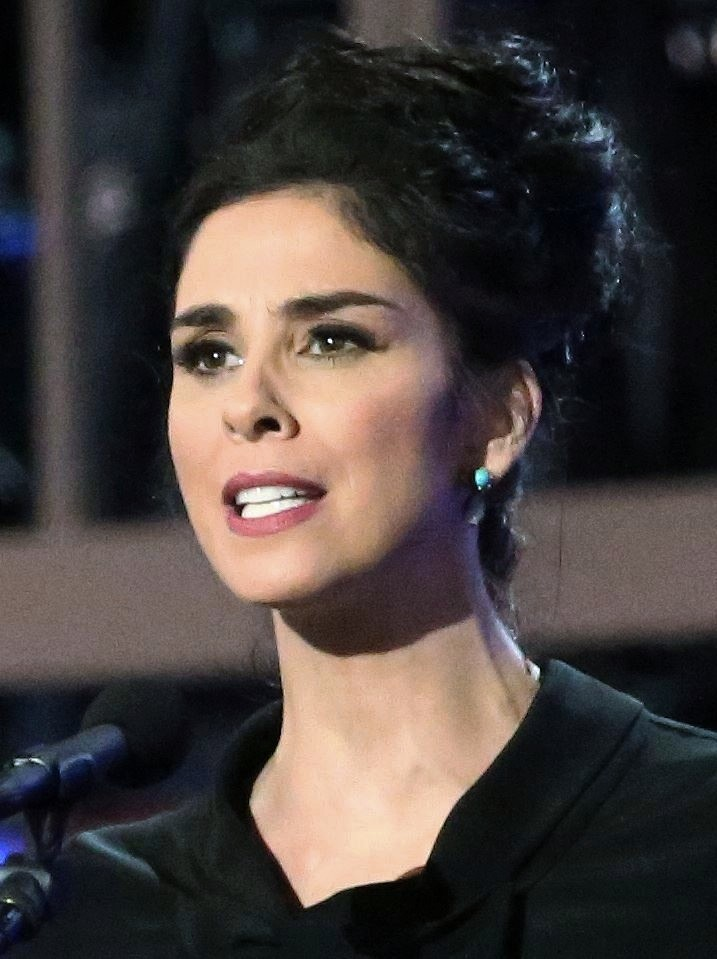
Sarah Silverman

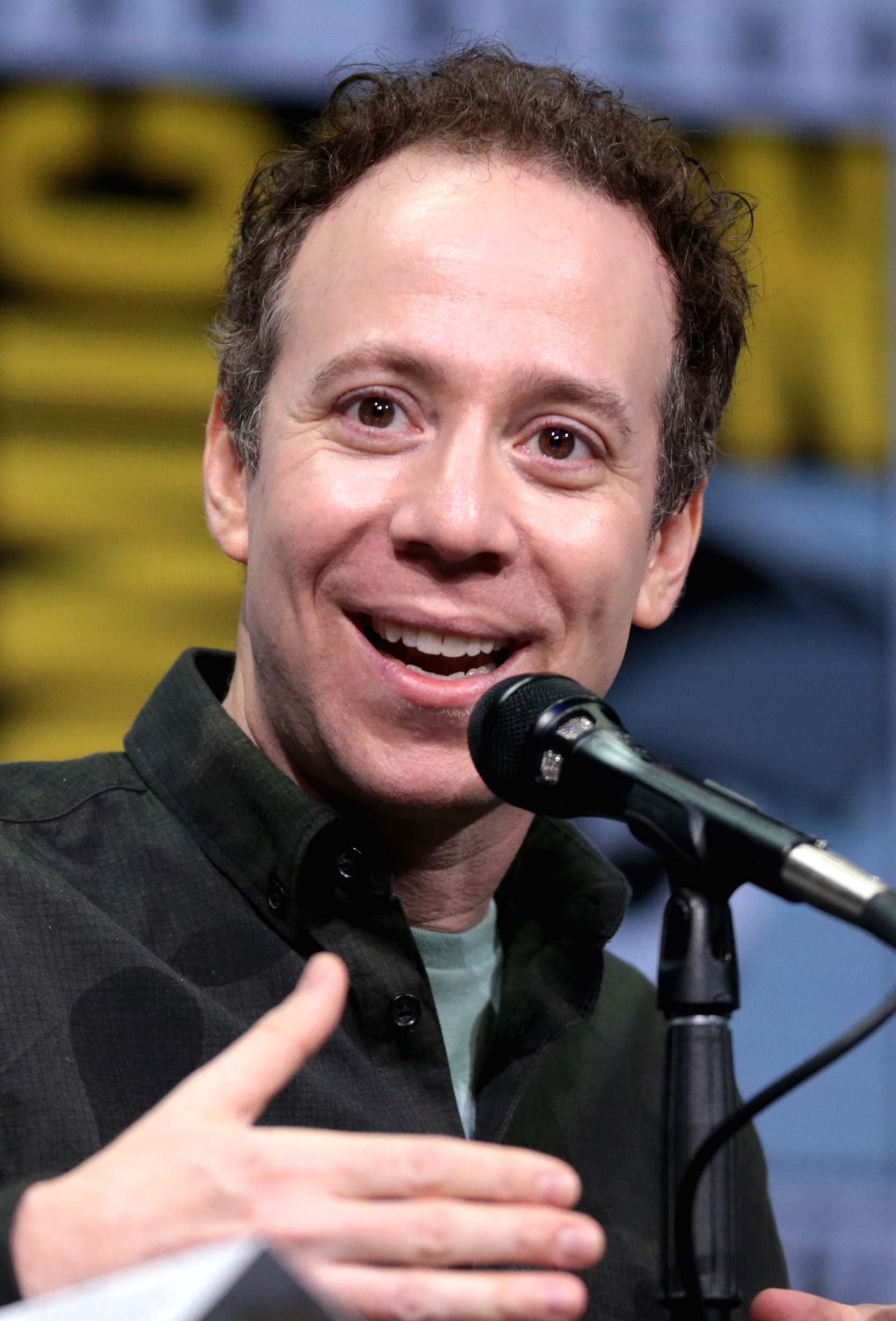
Kevin Sussman

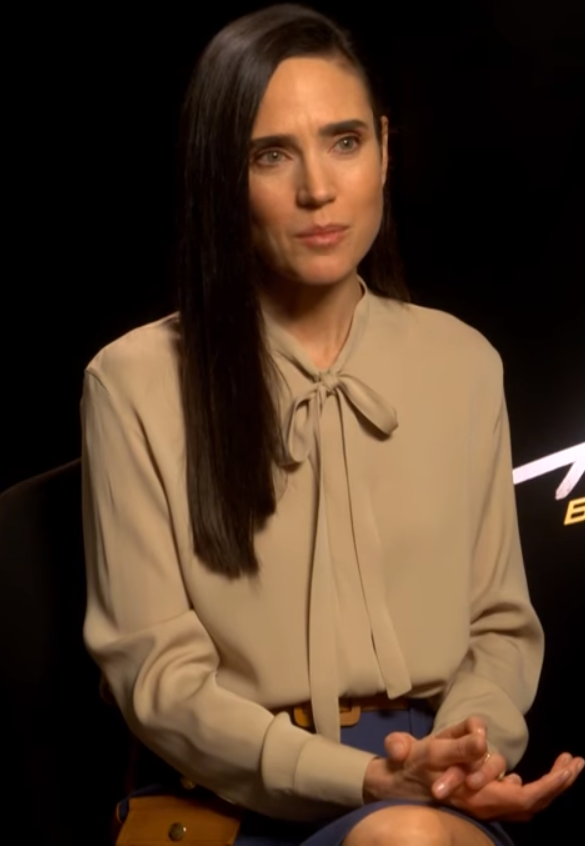
Jennifer Connelly

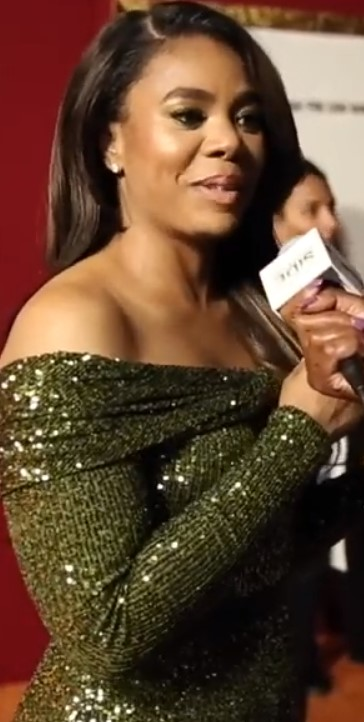
Regina Hall

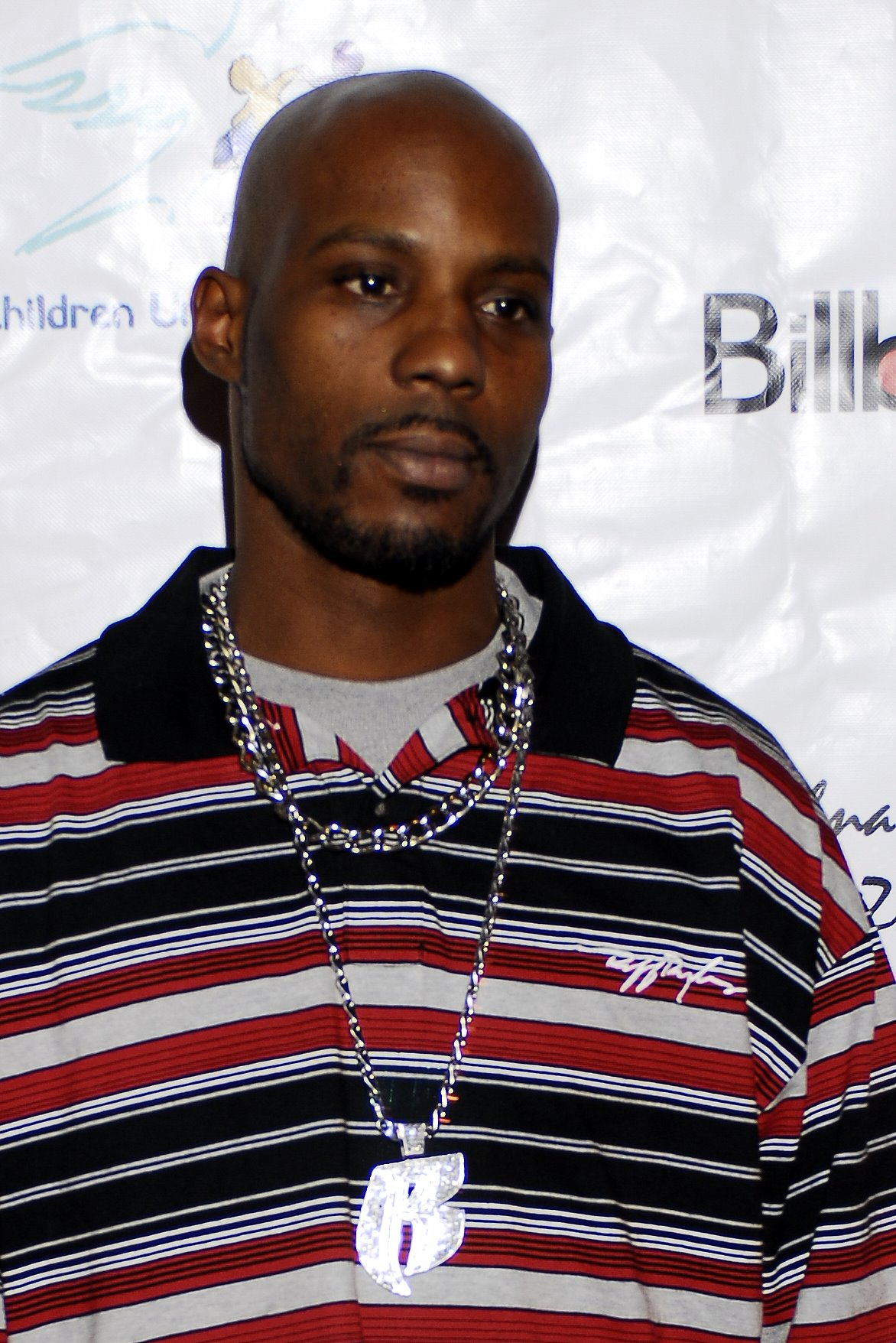
DMX

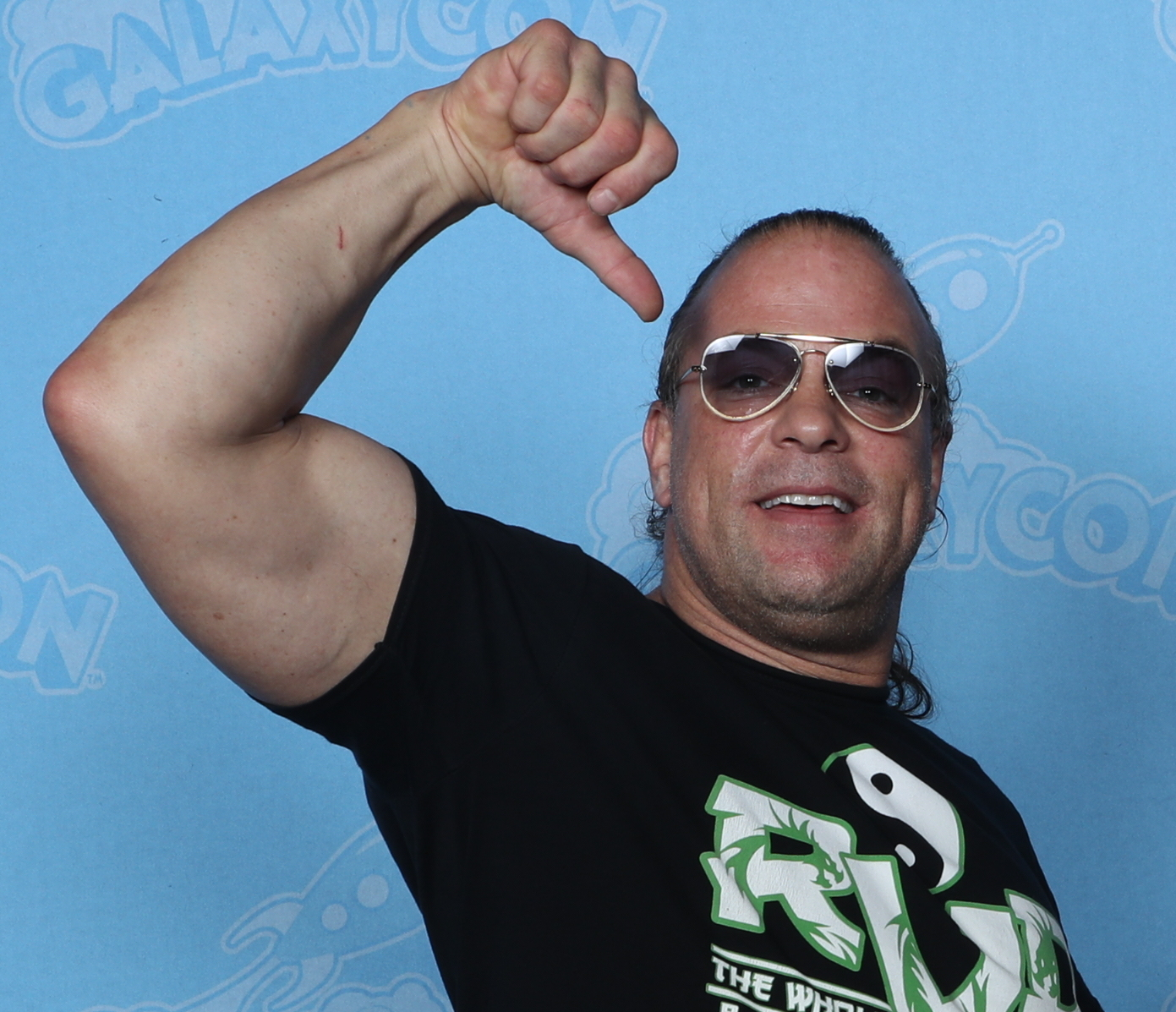
Rob Van Dam

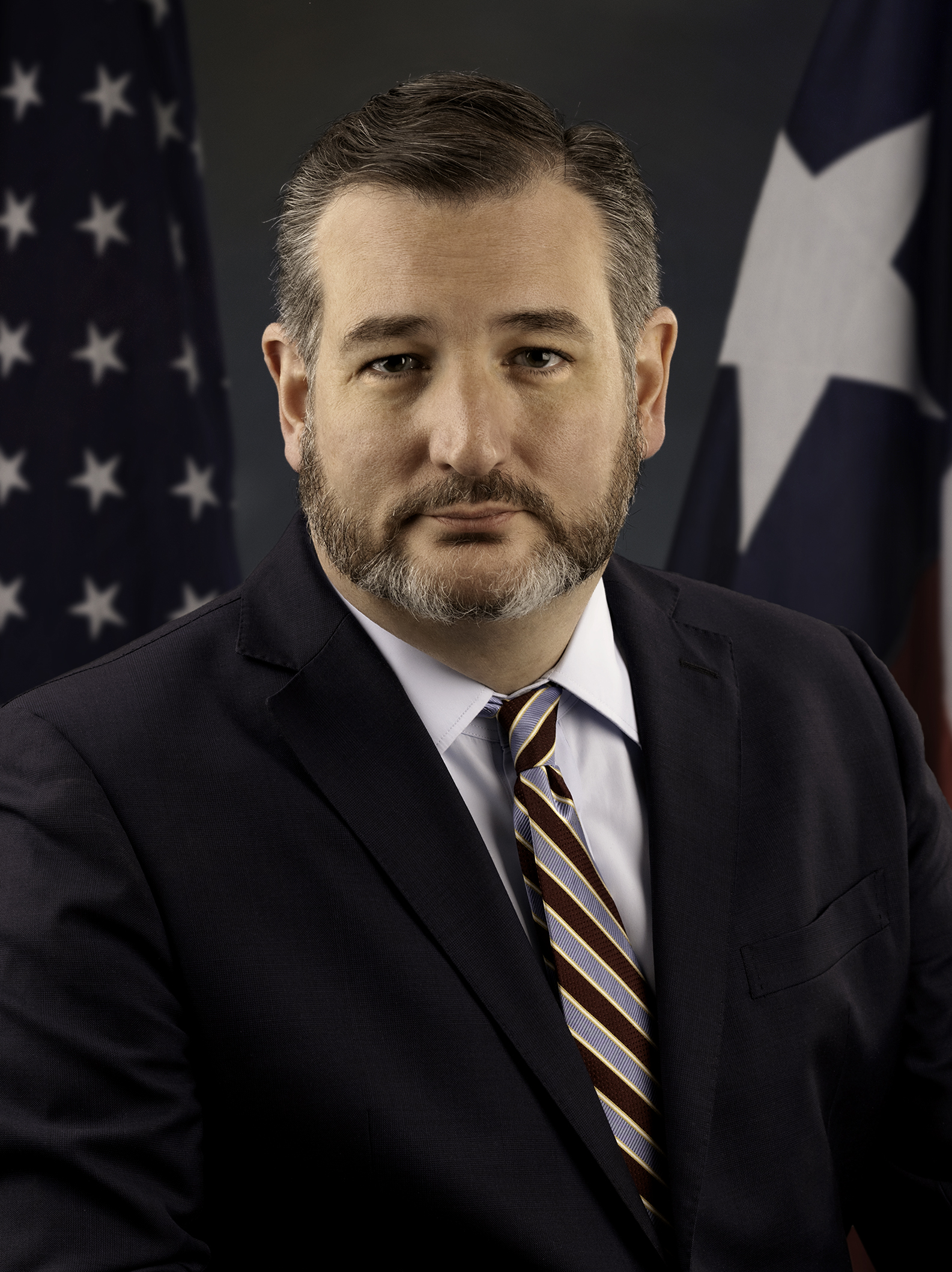
Ted Cruz

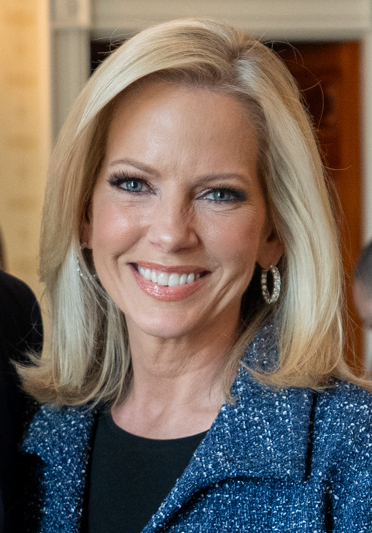
Shannon Bream

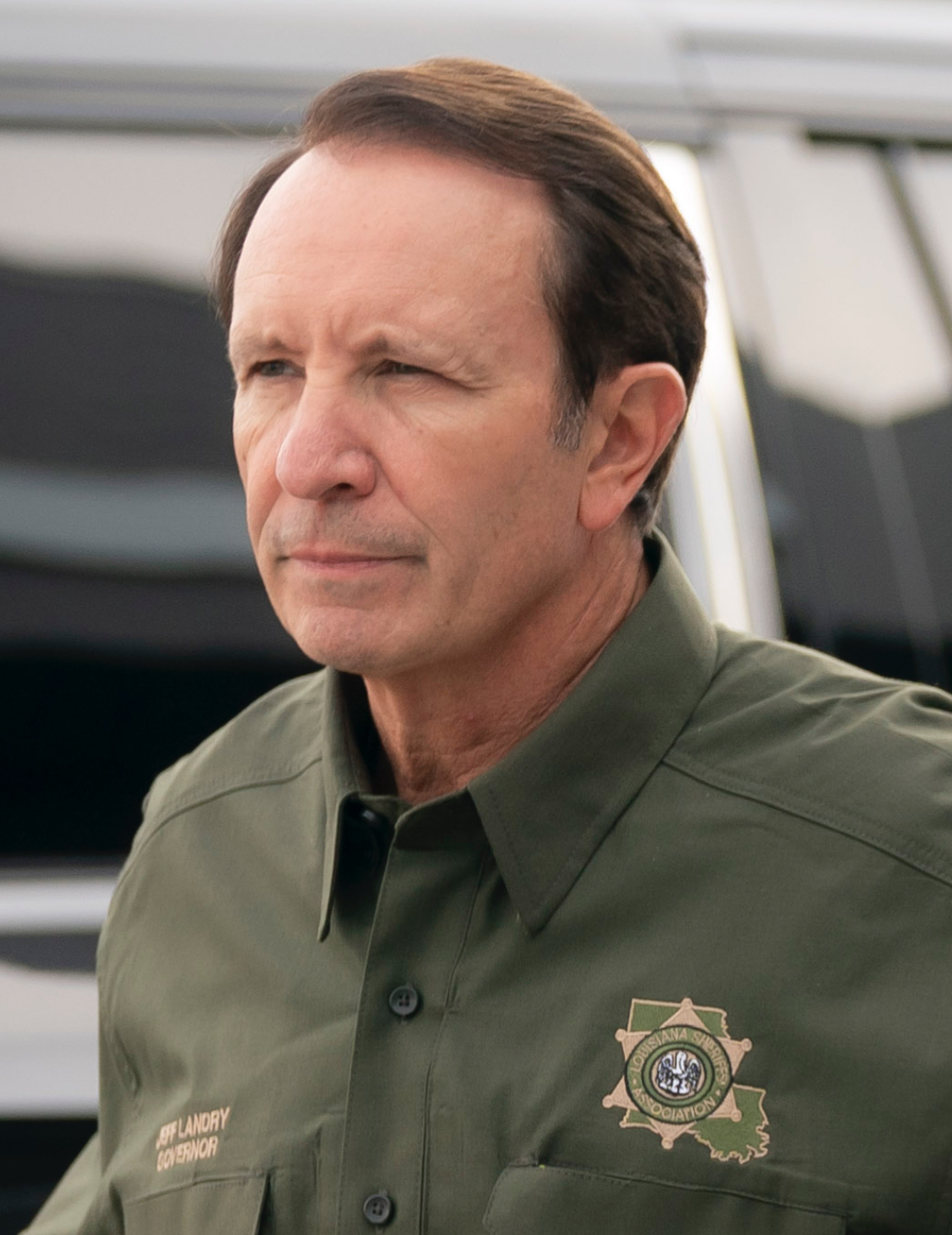
Jeff Landry

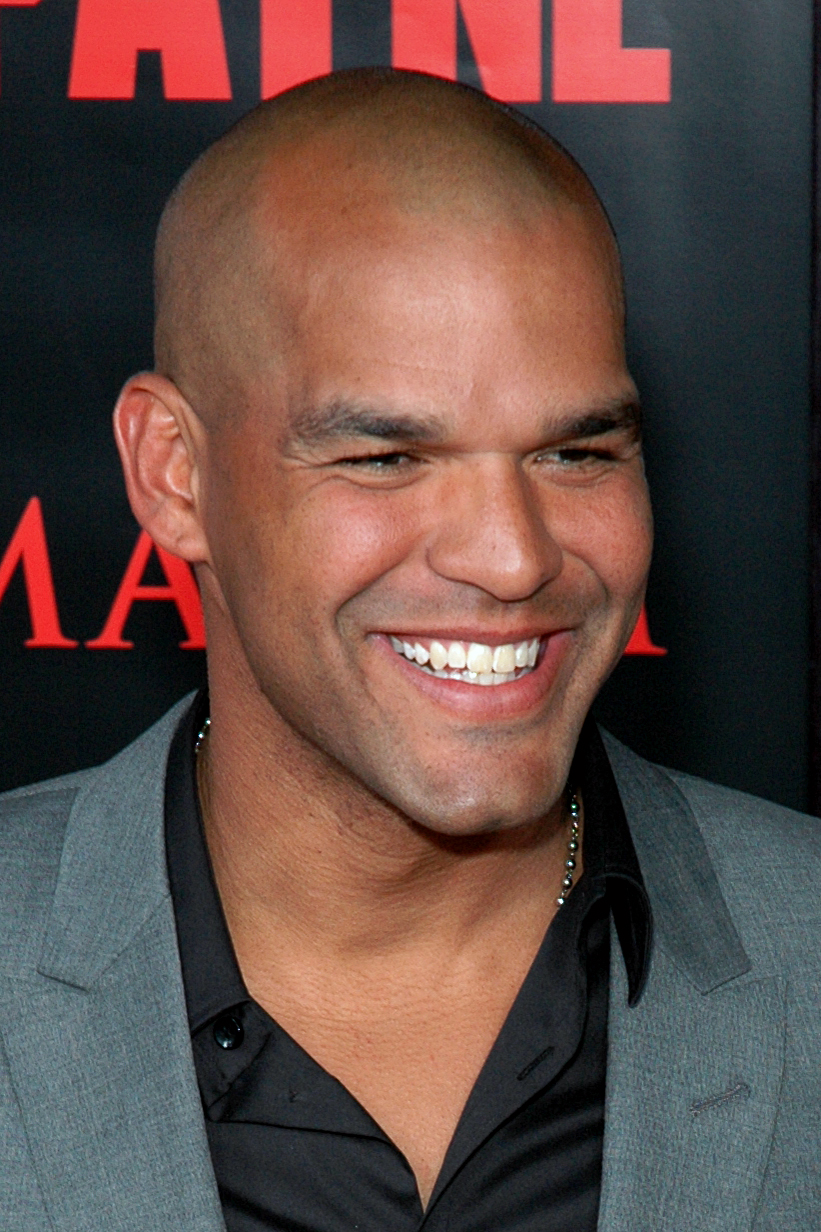
Amaury Nolasco

- December 1
  - Golden Brooks, actress
  - Sarah Silverman, actress and comedian
  - Amit Yoran, businessman, Chief Executive of Tenable, Inc. (2017-2024) (d. 2025)
- December 2
  - Joshua Seth, voice actor and hypnotist
  - Treach, rapper
  - Joe Lo Truglio, actor, comedian, writer, and producer
- December 3
  - Paul Byrd, baseball player
  - Stephanie Herseth Sandlin, politician
- December 4
  - Jeff Blake, football player
  - Norberto Bravo, boxer
  - Antwun Echols, boxer (d. 2023)
  - Fat Pat, rapper (d. 1998)
  - Kevin Sussman, actor and comedian
- December 6
  - Katie Arrington, politician
  - Andrea Baccarelli, Italian-born epigeneticist and clinical endocrinologist
  - Adrian Fenty, politician, Mayor of Washington, D.C. (2007–2011)
- December 8
  - Andy Bischoff, football coach
- December 9
  - Jennifer Brozek, author, writer, editor, and publisher
  - Kara DioGuardi, singer/songwriter and American Idol judge
  - Liz Friedlander, music video director and producer
- December 10
  - Nathan Ballentine, politician
  - Kevin Sharp, country music singer, and motivational speaker (d. 2014)
- December 11
  - Chris Anderson, golfer
  - Chris Henderson, soccer player
- December 12
  - Mädchen Amick, actress
  - Chris Brantley, football player
  - Mike Buddie, baseball player and athletic director
  - Jennifer Connelly, actress
  - Regina Hall, actress
  - John Waller, Christian singer/songwriter
- December 13
  - Tonja Buford-Bailey, Olympic hurdler
  - Bart Johnson, actor
- December 14
  - Nicholas Angelich, pianist (d. 2022)
  - Bradford Banta, football player
- December 15
  - Greg Abbey, voice actor
  - Mitchell Butler, basketball player and sports agent
- December 16 – Daniel Cosgrove, actor
- December 17
  - Chris Brinker, producer and director (d. 2013)
  - Sean Patrick Thomas, actor
- December 18
  - Norman Brown, blues guitarist and singer
  - Dave Bry, writer, editor, and journalist (d. 2017)
  - DMX, rapper (d. 2021)
  - Miles Marshall Lewis, author
  - Rob Van Dam, wrestler
- December 19
  - Tyson Beckford, model and actor
  - Beverly Bond, author, DJ, businesswoman, philanthropist, and model
  - Eric Alva, U.S. Marine and Iraqi War veteran
  - Stacy Jones, singer, frontman for American Hi-Fi, and drummer for Letters to Cleo
  - Todd Phillips, actor and filmmaker
  - Adrian Smith, politician
  - Suede, fashion designer
- December 20 – Bryan Barber, filmmaker and music video director
- December 21
  - Monique Ambers, basketball player and coach
  - Tim Armstrong, business executive
- December 22
  - Grady Brewer, boxer
  - Ted Cruz, Canadian-born politician
  - Clay Dreslough, game designer
- December 23
  - Shannon Bream, journalist
  - Karl Buechner, metalcore singer
  - Robert John Burck, singer/songwriter and street performer known as the Naked Cowboy
  - Jeff Landry, politician, 57th Governor of Louisiana (2024–present)
- December 24
  - Michael Batiste, football player
  - Breck Eisner, director
  - Amaury Nolasco, Puerto Rican-born actor and producer
- December 26 – Cece Bell, author, cartoonist, and illustrator
- December 27 – Michael Batayeh, comedian and actor (d. 2023)
- December 28
  - Blaine Berger, football player
  - Elaine Hendrix, actress
- December 29
  - Dallas Austin, musician, songwriter, record producer, and filmmaker
  - Glen Phillips, singer/songwriter and frontman of Toad the Wet Sprocket
  - Kevin Weisman, actor
- December 30
  - Ben Blomdahl, baseball player
  - Bart Evans, baseball player
- December 31
  - Dunstan Anderson, football player (d. 2004)
  - Nathan Ballingrud, writer
  - Bryon Russell, basketball player

=== Full date unknown ===
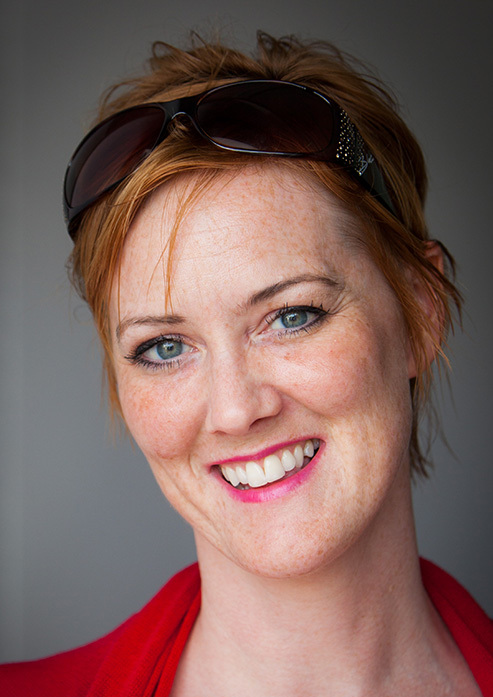
Heather Brooke

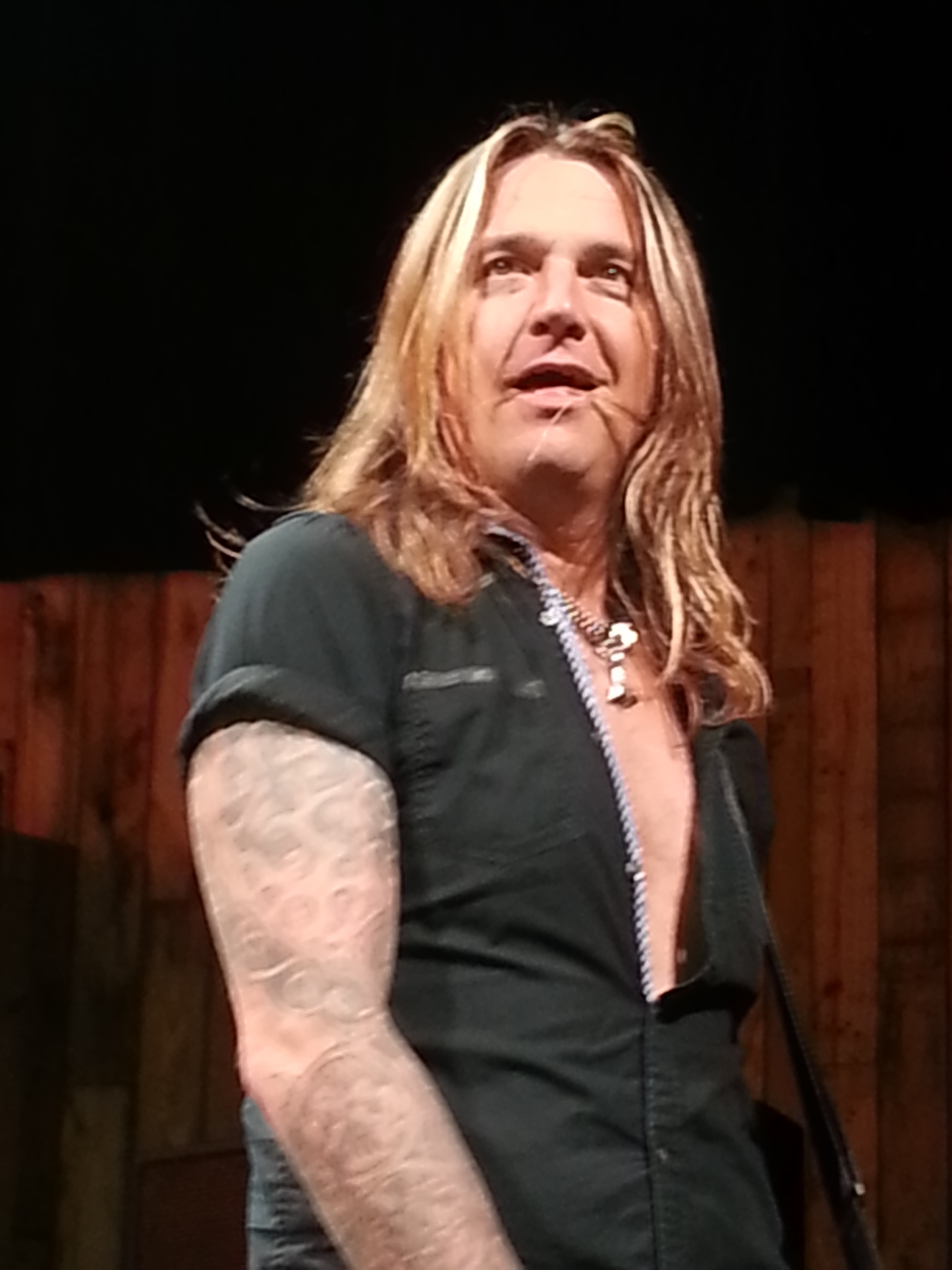
Roman Glick

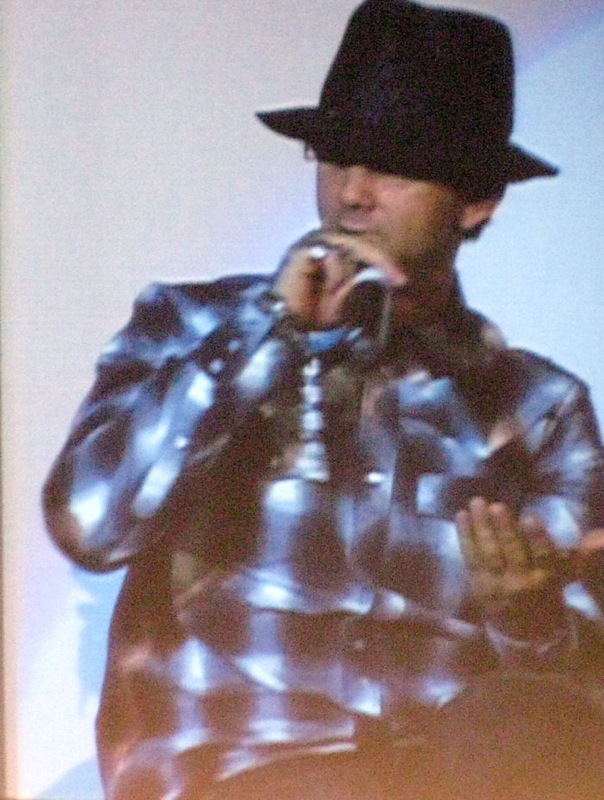
Jeffrey Sebelia

- Danielle Ackley-McPhail, author and editor
- Derrick Adams, artist and curator
- Greg Adams, writer
- J. A. Adande, sportswriter, commentator, and educator
- Ahmed Ahmed, Egyptian-born actor and comedian
- Robert Ahrens, producer
- Haluk Akakçe, Turkish-born artist (d. 2023)
- Romeo Alaeff, artist, photographer, filmmaker, author, and editor
- Chaz Allen, politician, mayor of Newton, Iowa (2004–2012)
- Rachel Allen, architect
- Todd M. Allen, Canadian-born immunologist and virologist (d. 2024)
- Ellen Altfest, painter
- Christopher Anderson, photographer
- Greg Anderson, guitarist for Goatsnake and co-founder of Southern Lord Records
- Keith Anderson, saxophonist
- Paul Anderson, politician
- Chris Applebaum, music video director
- Jason A. Archinaco, attorney
- Treena Livingston Arinzeh, University professor
- Oliver Arms, painter
- Dorsey Armstrong, scholar
- Scott Arpajian, technology executive, entrepreneur, author, and founder of Download.com
- Marina Arsenijevic, Serbian-born pianist and composer
- Jeff Atwood, software developer, author, blogger, and entrepreneur
- Shalom Auslander, novelist, memoirist, and essayist
- Deborah Babashoff, swimmer
- Joel Bach, journalist and producer
- Samuel Bagenstos, attorney and General Counsel of the United States Department of Health and Human Services (2022–present)
- Adam Leitman Bailey, lawyer
- Frank Bailey, author
- Bela Bajaria, English-born businesswoman and media executive
- Aleksander Balos, Polish-born artist and painter
- Jillian Balow, politician
- Edward E. Baptist, University professor, academic, and writer
- Daniel Barnz, screenwriter and director
- Neil Barofsky, law professor and Special Inspector General of the Troubled Asset Relief Program (2008-2011)
- Grant Barrett, lexicographer and radio personality
- Geoffrey Barrows, inventor and founder of Centeye
- Regina Barzilay, Moldovan-born Israeli-American computer scientist
- Cynthia L. Bauerly, lawyer and politician
- Jennifer Baumgardner, activist and filmmaker
- Josh Bazell, writer and doctor
- Christine Beatty, politician and convicted felon
- Kim Beck, artist
- Noah Becker, American-born Canadian artist, writer, publisher, and saxophonist
- Sarah-Marie Belcastro, mathematician and book author
- Anthony Bell, director, screenwriter, animator, and storyboard artist
- Joan Belmar, artist
- Tal Ben-Shahar, teacher and writer
- Krista Benjamin, poet and writer
- David Benveniste, entrepreneur
- Amy J. Berg, filmmaker
- John Berg, Catholic priest
- Adam Berinsky, University professor
- Sean Bernabe, US Army Lt. General
- Bradley Bernstein, University professor
- Samuel Bernstein, screenwriter, playwright, director, and author
- Drew Berry, American-born Australian biomedical animator
- Patrick Berry, puzzle creator
- Wayne Besen, journalist and LGBT advocate
- Amy Bessone, visual artist
- Sanford Biggers, artist
- Mary Bishai, physicist
- Laurie Bishop, politician
- Linda Black, politician
- Matt Black, photographer
- Elizabeth Blanton, astronomer
- Stephanie Blythe, opera singer
- Kevin Boehm, restauranteur
- Stephen R. Bough, judge
- Heather Boushey, economist
- Kimberly D. Bowes, archaeologist
- Daniel Patrick Boyd, convicted terrorist
- Dominic Boyer, anthropologist and filmmaker
- Christopher Bracey, University professor
- Tom Brantley, trombonist
- Sarina Brewer, artist
- Matt Briggs, novelist
- Brian Brock, theologian
- Heather Brooke, American-born British journalist
- Lola Brooks, artist and educator
- Rosa Brooks, journalist, lawyer, and University professor
- Stephanie Brooks, artist
- Chad Brown, politician
- Joseph D. Brown, lawyer and attorney
- Laura Brown, golfer
- Marla Brown, politician
- Ted Bruner, musician, songwriter, and record producer
- Carol Rifka Brunt, novelist and writer
- Angela Bryan, social psychologist
- Carmen Bugan, Romanian-born poet and writer
- Bartle Bull, businessman and writer
- Michael A. Burstein, writer
- Matthew Burtner, composer
- Denver Butler, politician
- Jonathan Byrd, singer/songwriter
- Geoff Edgers, journalist, author, filmmaker, television and podcast host
- Wanda Ewing, artist (d. 2013)
- Lisa Fairfax, legal scholar and professor at the University of Pennsylvania Law School
- Garrett Fisher, composer
- Gordon Gallagher, judge
- Roman Glick, bassist and guitarist
- Eric Heisserer, filmmaker, writer, producer, and comic book writer
- Todd Howard, video game designer, director, and producer, executive producer for Bethesda Game Studios
- Patrick Lachman, heavy metal singer and guitarist
- Jeffrey Sebelia, fashion designer
- Tony Simone, politician
- Kate Snyder, politician, mayor of Portland, Maine (2019–present)

== Deaths ==
- January 3 – Alicia Rhett, actress (b. 1915)
- January 5 – Cyril Fagan, Irish-born American astrologer and author (b. 1896)
- January 18 – David O. McKay, president of the Church of Jesus Christ of Latter-day Saints (b. 1873)
- January 19 – Hal March, comedian, actor, and emcee (b. 1920)
- January 20 – George M. Humphrey, lawyer and politician, Secretary to the Treasury (b. 1890)
- January 28 – Thomas J. Ryan, admiral (b. 1901)
- February 2 – Lawrence Gray, actor (b. 1898)
- February 6 – Roscoe Karns, actor (b. 1891)
- February 7 – Abe Attell, boxer (b. 1883)
- February 11 – Lee W. Stanley, cartoonist (b. 1885)
- February 14 – Arthur Edeson, cinematographer (b. 1891)
- February 22 – Edward Selzer, film producer (b. 1893)
- March 6 – William Hopper, actor (b. 1915)
- March 11 – Erle Stanley Gardner, author and lawyer (b. 1889)
- March 16 – Tammi Terrell, singer (b. 1945)
- March 23
  - Del Lord, Canadian-born film director and actor (b.1894)
  - Joe Pyne, radio and television host (b. 1924)
- March 30 – Heinrich Brüning, German politician and former Chancellor of Germany (born 1885)
- April 6 – Sam Sheppard, neurosurgeon (b. 1923)
- April 11 – Cathy O'Donnell, actress (b. 1923)
- April 15 – Ripper Collins, baseball player (b. 1904)
- April 18 – Glenn Tryon, actor, screenwriter, and film director (b. 1898)
- April 25 – Anita Louise, actress (b. 1915)
- April 26 – Gypsy Rose Lee, entertainer, stripper, actress, writer and vedette (b. 1911)
- April 28 – Ed Begley, actor (b. 1901)
- April 30 – Inger Stevens, Swedish-American actress (b. 1934)
- May 9 – Louise Freeland Jenkins, astronomer (b. 1888)
- May 14 – Billie Burke, Canadian-American actress (b. 1884)
- June 1 – George Watkins, baseball player (b. 1900)
- June 8 – Abraham Maslow, psychologist (b. 1908)
- June 16 – Brian Piccolo, American football player (b. 1943)
- July 13 – Leslie Groves, military officer (b. 1896)
- July 26 – Milner Baily Schaefer, fisheries scientist (b. 1912)
- August 1 – Frances Farmer, actress and TV hostess (b. 1913)
- August 12 – Glenn Hartranft, athlete (b. 1901)
- August 20 – Mickey Daniels, actor (b. 1914)
- August 30
  - Del Moore, actor, comedian and radio announcer (b. 1916)
  - Margaret Utinsky, nurse, recipient of the Medal of Freedom (b. 1900)
  - Abraham Zapruder, Ukrainian-born American clothing manufacturer and witness to the assassination of John F. Kennedy (b. 1905)
- September 3
  - Vince Lombardi, American football coach and National Football League executive (b. 1913)
  - Alan Wilson, musician and composer (b. 1943)
- September 8 – Percy Spencer, inventor of the microwave oven (b. 1894)
- September 11 – Chester Morris, actor (b. 1901)
- September 15 – Blue Washington, actor and Negro league baseball player (b. 1898)
- September 18 – Jimi Hendrix, musician, singer, and songwriter (b. 1942)
- September 22 – Joe Hickey, politician and jurist, governor and senator from Wyoming (b. 1911)
- September 25 – Erich Maria Remarque, German-born American novelist (b. 1898)
- September 29 – Edward Everett Horton, actor (b. 1886)
- October 4 – Janis Joplin, singer and songwriter (b. 1943)
- October 21 – John T. Scopes, teacher and football coach (b. 1900)
- November 26 – Benjamin O. Davis Sr. US Army General. First African-American to rise to the rank of Brigadier General. (b. 1877)
- December 7 – Rube Goldberg, cartoonist, sculptor, author, engineer, and inventor (b. 1883)
- December 12
  - Carolyn Craig, actress (b. 1934)
  - George Terwilliger, film director and screenwriter (b. 1882)
- December 23 – Charlie Ruggles, actor (b. 1886)
- December 24 – Charles M. Cooke Jr., admiral (b. 1886)
- December 30 – Sonny Liston, professional boxer (b. 1930)

== See also ==
- List of American films of 1970
- Timeline of United States history (1970–1989)
